There are more than 640,000 living alumni of the University of Michigan in 180 countries across the globe. Notable alumni include computer scientist and entrepreneur Larry Page, actor James Earl Jones, and President of the United States Gerald Ford.

Alumni

Nobel laureates

Stanley Cohen (Ph.D. 1949), co-winner of the 1986 Nobel Prize in Physiology or Medicine for discovering growth factors (proteins regulating cell growth) in human and animal tissue
Jerome Karle (Ph.D. 1944), chief scientist, Laboratory for the Structure of Matter, Naval Research Laboratory; Nobel Prize in Chemistry, 1985
Paul Milgrom  (BA 1970) is an American economist and won the prize for economics in 2020
Marshall Nirenberg (Ph.D. 1957), Chief of Biomedical Genetics, National Heart, Lung and Blood Institute, NIH; Nobel Prize in Physiology or Medicine, 1968
H. David Politzer (BS 1969), physicist; professor at California Institute of Technology; Nobel Prize in Physics, 2004
Robert Shiller (BA 1967), economist, academic, and best-selling author
Richard Smalley (COE: BS 1965), chemist, Nobel Prize in 1996 for the co-discovery of fullerenes
Samuel C. C. Ting (BS 1959, Ph.D. 1962), physicist, awarded Nobel Prize in 1976 for discovering the J/ψ particle
Thomas H. Weller (A.B. 1936, M.S. 1937), Nobel Prize in Physiology or Medicine, 1954

Activists
Benjamin Aaron (LS&A 1937), scholar of labor law; director of the National War Labor Board during World War II; vice chairman of the National Wage Stabilization Board during the Truman administration
Ricardo Ainslie (Ph.D.), native of Mexico City, Mexico; Guggenheim award winner
Santos Primo Amadeo (BA), a.k.a. "Champion of Hábeas Corpus;" attorney and law professor at the University of Puerto Rico; Senator in the Puerto Rico legislature; counsel to the American Civil Liberties Union branch in Puerto Rico, established in 1937; winner of a Guggenheim award
Huwaida Arraf (LS&A: 1998), Palestinian rights activist; co-founder of the International Solidarity Movement; chair of the Free Gaza Movement
Octavia Williams Bates (BA 1877; LAW 1896), suffragist, clubwoman, author
Jan BenDor (SOSW M.S.W.), women's rights activist, member of Michigan Women's Hall of Fame
Bunyan Bryant, environmental justice advocate 
Mary Frances Berry (LAW: JD/Ph.D.), former chairwoman of United States Civil Rights Commission
Cindy Cohn (LAW: JD 1988), attorney for Bernstein v. United States, legal director for the Electronic Frontier Foundation
Richard Cordley (BA 1854), abolitionist minister who served Lawrence, Kansas during the 19th century
George William Crockett (LAW: JD 1934), African American attorney; state court judge in Detroit, Michigan; US Representative; national vice-president of the National Lawyers Guild; participated in the founding convention of the racially integrated National Lawyers Guild in 1937, and later served as its national vice-president; first African American lawyer in the U.S. Department of Labor (1939–1943)
Clarence Darrow (LAW 1878), Leopold and Loeb lawyer, defense attorney for John T. Scopes
Terry Davis (BUS: MBA 1962), member of the UK Parliament for 28 years, now Secretary General of the Council of Europe and human rights activist
Geoffrey Fieger (BA 1974; MA 1976), attorney; defense attorney for Jack Kevorkian
Alan Haber, first president of the Students for a Democratic Society
Tom Hayden, author of Port Huron Statement; member of Chicago Seven; co-founder of Students for a Democratic Society; member of each house of California's Legislature
Alireza Jafarzadeh, Iranian activist and nuclear analyst
Lyman T. Johnson (AM 1931), history graduate; the grandson of slaves; successfully sued to integrate the University of Kentucky, opening that state's colleges and universities to African-Americans five years before the landmark Brown v. Board of Education ruling
Maureen Greenwood, human rights activist active in Russia
Belford Vance Lawson, Jr., attorney who made at least eight appearances before the Supreme Court; attended Michigan and became the school's first African American varsity football player
Michael Newdow (LAW: JD 1988), made headlines by challenging the constitutionality of the Pledge of Allegiance
Carl Oglesby, writer, academic, and political activist; president of the radical student organization Students for a Democratic Society from 1965 to 1966
Laura Packard (BS 1997), health care activist, blocked by Donald Trump on Twitter, spoke at 2020 Democratic National Convention.
Milo Radulovich, became a symbol of the excesses of anti-Communism when he challenged his removal from the Air Force Reserve (judged a security risk) and his story was chronicled by Edward Murrow in 1953 on the television newsmagazine program See It Now; in 2008 the Board of Regents approved a posthumous Bachelor of Science degree with a concentration in physics
Ralph Rose, six-time Olympic medalist, began the tradition of refusing to dip the United States flag during opening ceremonies
Eliza Read Sunderland (PH.B 1889; PH.D. 1892), writer, educator, lecturer, women's rights advocate
Jack Hood Vaughn (BA, MA), second director of the United States Peace Corps, succeeding Sargent Shriver
Raoul Wallenberg (ARCH: B.Arch. 1935), Swedish diplomat, rescued thousands of Jews during the Holocaust, primarily in Hungary
Jerry White (BUS: MBA 2005), co-founder and executive director of the Landmine Survivors Network
Hao Wu (BUS: MBA 2000), documentary filmmaker and blogger; controversially imprisoned by Chinese government for 5 months in 2006
Susan Lederman (BA 1958), President of the League of US Women Voters

AAAI, ACM, IEEE Fellows and Awardees
As of 2021, more than 65 Michigan alumni have been named as Fellows.  Of those alumni, 4 have been awarded the Eckert-Mauchly Award (out of the 42 total awards granted), the most prestigious award for contributions to computer architecture.
Gul Agha (computer scientist) IEEE ACM Fellow
Frances Allen ACM Fellow; was an American computer scientist and pioneer in the field of optimizing compilers; a Turing Award winner;
Remzi Arpaci-Dusseau ACM Fellow; winner of the SIGOPS Mark Weiser Award
Farrokh Ayazi was named Fellow of the Institute of Electrical and Electronics Engineers (IEEE) in 2013[2] for contributions to micro-electro-mechanical resonators and resonant gyroscopes.
Andrew Barto, IEEE Fellow; IEEE Neural Networks Society Pioneer Award.
Paul R. Berger (BS Engin. Physics 1985, MS EE 1987, Ph.D. EE 1990) was named an IEEE Fellow (2011), an Outstanding Engineering Educator for State of Ohio (2014) and a Fulbright-Nokia Distinguished Chair in Information and Communications Technologies (2020).
Randal Bryant ACM Fellow; IEEE Fellow
Robert Cailliau ACM Software System Award for Co-development of the World Wide Web
Sunghyun Choi, named an IEEE Fellow in 2014
Edgar F. Codd A Turing Award winner, was an English computer scientist who, while working for IBM, invented the relational model for database management, the theoretical basis for relational databases and relational database management systems; Turing Award Winner;
Stephen Cook, ACM Fellow; OC, OOnt (born December 14, 1939) is an American-Canadian computer scientist and mathematician who has made major contributions to the fields of complexity theory and proof complexity as a Turing Award Winner;
Edward S. Davidson IEEE Fellow; 2000 IEEE/ACM Eckert-Mauchly Award "for his seminal contributions to the design, implementation, and performance evaluation of high performance pipelines and multiprocessor systems"
David DeWitt ACM Fellow; He received the ACM SIGMOD Innovations Award (now renamed SIGMOD Edgar F. Codd Innovations Award) in 1995 for his contributions to the database systems field.
Alexandra Duel-Hallen is a professor of electrical and computer engineering at North Carolina State University known for her research in wireless networks and was named an IEEE Fellow in 2011.
George V. Eleftheriades is a researcher in the field of metamaterials. He is a fellow of the  IEEE and the Royal Society of Canada.
Usama Fayyad  He holds over 30 patents and is a Fellow of both the AAAI (Association for Advancement of Artificial Intelligence) and the ACM (Association of Computing Machinery).
Michael J. Fischer ACM Fellow; is a computer scientist who works in the fields of distributed computing, parallel computing, cryptography, algorithms and data structures, and computational complexity. Fischer served as the editor-in-chief of the Journal of the ACM in 1982–1986.
James D. Foley is an ACM Fellow an IEEE Fellow and a member of the National Academy of Engineering
Stephanie Forrest ACM/AAAI Allen Newell Award (2011)
Elmer G. Gilbert IEEE Fellow. In control theory, he is well known for the “Gilbert realization,” still a standard topic in systems textbooks, and developed the foundational results for control over a moving horizon, which underlies model predictive control (MPC). Prof. Gilbert is a member of the National Academy of Engineering, and Fellow of IEEE and the American Association for the Advancement of Science.
Lee Giles ACM Fellow; IEEE Fellow; Most recently he received the 2018 Institute of Electrical and Electronics Engineers (IEEE) Computational Intelligence Society (CIS) Neural Networks Pioneer Award and the 2018 National Federation of Advanced Information Services (NFAIS) Miles Conrad Award.
Adele Goldberg (computer scientist) was president of the Association for computing Machinery (ACM) from 1984 to 1986
Robert M. Graham (ACM Fellow) was a cybersecurity researcher computer scientist
Herb Grosch ACM Fellow; Grosch received the Association for Computing Machinery Fellows Award in 1995; was an early computer scientist, perhaps best known for Grosch's law
Mark Guzdial ACM Fellow; He was the original developer of the CoWeb (or Swiki), one of the earliest wiki engines, which was implemented in Squeak and has been in use at institutions of higher education since 1998.
Rick Hayes-Roth AAAI Fellow; 
Mark D. Hill He was named an Association for Computing Machinery Fellow in 2004 for "contributions to memory consistency models and memory system design", and was awarded the ACM SIGARCH Alan D. Berenbaum Distinguished Service Award in 2009; In 2019, he received the 2019 ACM - IEEE CS Eckert-Mauchly Award for "seminal contributions to the fields of cache memories, memory consistency models, transactional memory, and simulation."
Julia Hirschberg IEEE Fellow, member of the National Academy of Engineering, ACM Fellow, AAAI Fellow.
John M. Hollerbach named IEEE Fellow in 1996
Tara Javidi IEEE Fellow;
Bill Joy co-founder of Sun Microsystems In 1986, was awarded a Grace Murray Hopper Award by the ACM for his work on the Berkeley UNIX Operating System.
Nam Sung Kim, IEEE Fellow
John D. Kraus IEEE Fellow; winner of a IEEE Centennial Medal winner of the IEEE Heinrich Hertz Medal
David Kuck,  Kuck is a fellow of the American Association for the Advancement of Science, the Association for Computing Machinery (ACM), and the Institute of Electrical and Electronics Engineers. He is also a member of the National Academy of Engineering. He has won the Eckert-Mauchly Award from ACM/IEEE and the IEEE Computer Society Charles Babbage Award.
Cliff Lampe Since 2018 he has been executive vice president for ACM SIGCHI.
John E. Laird ACM Fellow; AAAI Fellow; AAAS member;
Carl Landwehr IEEE Fellow; winner of the ACM's SIGSAC's Outstanding Contribution Award (2013)
Peter Lee (computer scientist) ACM Fellow. A longtime "Microsoft Researcher," Mr. Lee became the organization's head in 2013. In 2014, the organization had 1,100 advanced researchers "working in 55 areas of study in a dozen labs worldwide."
Chih-Jen Lin ACM Fellow; AAAI Fellow; IEEE Fellow is a leading researcher in machine learning, optimization, and data mining
K. J. Ray Liu IEEE Fellow; Liu was elected as 2021 IEEE President-Elect, and will serve as 2022 IEEE President and CEO.
Patrick Drew McDaniel ACM Fellow; IEEE Fellow
Olgica Milenkovic was named an IEEE Fellow "for contributions to genomic data compression".
Edmund Miller was named an IEEE Fellow "for contributions to computational electromagnetics".
David L. Mills He invented the Network Time Protocol (1981), the DEC LSI-11 based fuzzball router that was used for the 56 kbit/s NSFNET (1985), the Exterior Gateway Protocol (1984), inspired the author of ping for BSD (1983), and had the first FTP implementation. IEEE Fellow; winner of the IEEE Internet Award in 2013
Yi Murphey IEEE Fellow; 
Shamkant Navathe ACM Fellow; a noted researcher in the field of databases with more than 150 publications on different topics in the area of databases.
Judith S. Olson ACM Fellow with over 110 published research articles
Kunle Olukotun ACM Fellow; is known as the “father of the multi-core processor”
Elliott Organick Founder of ACM Special Interest Group on Computer Science Education, SIGCSE Award for Outstanding Contribution to Computer Science Education(1985)
C. Raymond Perrault named a founding member of AAAI in 1990 and a AAAS member in 2011
Raymond Reiter was a Fellow of the Association for Computing Machinery (ACM), an AAAI Fellow, and a Fellow of the Royal Society of Canada.
Paul Resnick ACM Fellow as a result of his contributions to recommender systems, economics and computation, and online communities. Winner of the 2010 ACM Software Systems Award
Jennifer Rexford won the ACM Grace Murray Hopper Award (the award goes to a computer professional who makes a single, significant technical or service contribution at or before age 35) in 2005, for her work on introducing network routing subject to the different business interests of the operators of different subnetworks into Border Gateway Protocol.
Wally Rhines was named overall CEO of the Year by Portland Business Journal in 2012 and Oregon Technology Executive of the Year by the Technology Association of Oregon in 2003. He was named an IEEE Fellow in 2017. 
Keith W. Ross ACM Fellow; He is the Dean of Engineering and Computer Science at NYU Shanghai and a computer science professor at the New York University Tandon School of Engineering.
Ronitt Rubinfeld ACM Fellow as of 2017 for Association for Computing Machinery for contributions to delegated computation, sublinear time algorithms and property testing.
Rob A. Rutenbar ACM Fellow; IEEE Fellow
Claude Shannon  IEEE Medal of Honor; National Medal of Science; Claude E. Shannon Award
Daniel Siewiorek ACM, AAAS, IEEE Fellow; winner of the IEEE/ACM Eckert-Mauchly Award
David Slepian, IEEE Fellow; winner of a IEEE Centennial Medal
Anna Stefanopoulou IEEE Fellow, 
Michael Stonebraker A Turing Award winner, He is the founder of many database companies, including Ingres Corporation, Illustra, Paradigm4, StreamBase Systems, Tamr, Vertica and VoltDB, and served as chief technical officer of Informix.
James W. Thatcher winner of ACM SIG Access Award (2008), for Outstanding Contributions to Computing and Accessibility for his contributions to digital accessibility
Eugene C. Whitney is an IEEE Fellow and a member of the IEEE Rotating Machinery, Synchronous and the Power Generation Hydraulic subcommittees.
Louise Trevillyan 2012: ACM SIGDA Pioneering Achievement Award
W. Rae Young In 1964 Mr. Young was named an IEEE Fellow "for contributions to mobile radio and data communications systems".
Bernard P. Zeigler IEEE Fellow in recognition of his contributions to the theory of discrete event simulation;
Xi Zhang (professor) Is an IEEE Fellow

Aerospace

Claudia Alexander (Ph.D. 1993), member of the technical staff at the Jet Propulsion Laboratory; the last project manager of NASA's Galileo mission to Jupiter; project manager of NASA's role in the European-led Rosetta mission to study comet 67P/Churyumov-Gerasimenko; once named UM's Woman of the Year
Aisha Bowe (BS, MS 2009), NASA aerospace engineer; CEO of STEMBoard, a technology company
Robert A. Fuhrman (BS AE), pioneering Lockheed engineer who played a central role in the creation of the Polaris and Poseidon missiles; during more than three decades at Lockheed, he served as president of three of its companies: Lockheed-Georgia, Lockheed-California, and Lockheed Missiles & Space; became president and chief operating officer of the corporation in 1986 and vice chairman in 1988; retired in 1990
Edgar Nathaniel Gott (COE: 1909), early aviation industry executive; co-founder and first president of the Boeing Company; senior executive of several aircraft companies, including Fokker and Consolidated Aircraft
Robert Hall (COE: BSE 1927), designer of the Granville Brothers Aircraft Gee Bee Z racer that won the 1931 Thompson Trophy race; Grumman test pilot; credited with major role in the design of the Grumman F4F Wildcat, F6F Hellcat and TBM Avenger
Willis Hawkins (COE: BSE 1937), Lockheed engineer; contributed to the designs of historic Lockheed aircraft including the Constellation, P-80 Shooting Star, XF-90, F-94 Starfire, F-104 Starfighter and C-130 Hercules; later President of Lockheed
Clarence "Kelly" Johnson (COE: 1932 BSE, 1933 MSE, 1964 PhD (Hon.)), founder of the Lockheed Skunk Works; designer of the Lockheed P-38 Lightning, P-80 Shooting Star, JetStar, F-104 Starfighter, U-2 and SR-71 Blackbird; winner of the National Medal of Science
Vania Jordanova (Ph.D. 1995), physicist
Edgar J. Lesher, aircraft designer; pilot; professor of aerospace engineering
Elizabeth Muriel Gregory "Elsie" MacGill (COE: MSE) OC, known as the "Queen of the Hurricanes"; first female aircraft designer
Joseph Francis Shea (BS 1946, MS 1950, Ph.D. 1955), manager of the Apollo Spacecraft Program office during Project Apollo

Art, architecture, and design
See List of University of Michigan arts alumni

Arts and entertainment
See List of University of Michigan arts alumni

Astronauts

Daniel T. Barry (medical internship), engineer, scientist, retired NASA astronaut
Andre Douglas, earned a bachelor’s degree in mechanical engineering from the U.S. Coast Guard Academy, a master’s degree in mechanical engineering from the University of Michigan, a master’s degree in naval architecture and marine engineering from the University of Michigan, a master’s degree in electrical and computer engineering from Johns Hopkins University, and a doctorate in systems engineering from the George Washington. Named a NASA astronaut in 2021.
Theodore Freeman (COE: MSAE 1960), one of the third group of astronauts selected by NASA; died in T-38 crash at Ellington Air Force Base
Karl G. Henize (Ph.D. 1954), STS-51-F, 1985
James Irwin (COE: MSAE 1957), Apollo 15, 1971, one of twelve men to have walked on the Moon; one of six men to ride the Lunar Roving Vehicle on the Moon; co-founded alumni club of the Moon
Jack Lousma (COE: BSAE 1959), Skylab 3 1973; STS-3, 1982
James McDivitt (COE: BSE AA 1959, ScD hon. 1965), graduated first in his class; Command Pilot Gemini 4 part of an all UM crew, 1965; Commander Apollo 9; Program Manager for Apollo 12–16; Brigadier general, U.S. Air Force; vice president (retired), Rockwell International Corporation
Donald Ray McMonagle (MBA 2003), retired USAF Colonel, USAF; became manager of launch integration at the Kennedy Space Center in 1997
David Scott (MDNG: 1949–1950; ScD hon. 1971), Apollo 15, 1971; one of twelve men to have walked on the Moon; first man to drive a lunar rover on the Moon; co-founded alumni club of the Moon
James M. Taylor (B.S. 1959), Air Force astronaut, test pilot
Ed White (COE: MSAE 1959, Hon. PhD Astronautics 1965), first American to walk in space (Gemini 4) part of an all UM crew, 1965; died in Apollo 1 test accident, 1967
Alfred Worden (COE: MSAE 1964, Scd hon. 1971), Apollo 15, 1971; co-founded alumni club of the Moon

A campus plaza was named for McDivitt and White in 1965 to honor their accomplishments on the Gemini IV spacewalk. (At the time of its dedication, the plaza was near the engineering program's facilities, but the College of Engineering has since been moved. The campus plaza honoring them remains.) Two NASA space flights have been crewed entirely by University of Michigan degree-holders: Gemini IV by James McDivitt and Ed White in 1965 and Apollo 15 by Alfred Worden, David Scott (honorary degree) and James Irwin in 1971. The Apollo 15 astronauts left a 45-word plaque on the Moon establishing its own chapter of the University of Michigan Alumni Association. The Apollo 15 crew also named a crater on the Moon "Wolverine".

Belles lettres
See List of University of Michigan arts alumni

Business
See List of University of Michigan business alumni

Churchill Scholarship or Marshall Scholarship
Churchill Scholarships are annual scholarships offered to graduates of participating universities in the United States and Australia, to pursue studies in engineering, mathematics, or other sciences for one year at Churchill College in the University of Cambridge.

 2022–2023: Karthik Ravi, Medical Sciences
 2011–2012: David Montague, Pure Mathematics
 2009–2010: Eszter Zavodszky, Medical Genetics
 2007–2008: Lyric Chen, BA in Political Science and Economics from the University of Michigan, Marshall Scholar 2007
 2006–2007: Charles Crissman, Pure Mathematics
 2005–2006: Christopher Hayward, Applied Mathematics and Theoretical Physics
 2005–2006: Jacob Bourjaily, graduated with honors, degree in Mathematics, Physics Marshall Scholar 2005
 1996–1997: Amy S. Faranski, Engineering
 1993–1994: Ariel K. Smits Neis, Clinical Biochemistry
 1990–1991: David J. Schwartz, Chemistry
 1989–1990: Eric J. Hooper, Physics
 1987–1988: Michael K. Rosen, Chemistry
 1985–1986: Laird Bloom, Molecular Biology
 1984–1985: Julia M. Carter, Chemistry
 1979–1980: David W. Mead, Engineering, Chemical

Computers, engineering, and technology
Benjamin Franklin Bailey, studied electrical engineering; chief engineer of the Fairbanks Morse Electrical Manufacturing Company and Howell Electrical Motor Company; director of Bailey Electrical Company; vice-president and director of the Fremont Motor Corporation; became professor of electrical engineering at UM in 1913
Arden L. Bement Jr. (Ph.D. 1963), director of the National Science Foundation (NSF); awarded the ANSI's Chairman's award in 2005
Jason Blessing, former CEO of Plex Systems and current CEO of Model N (company)
James Blinn (BS Physics and Communications Science 1970, MS Information and Control Engineering, 1972), 3D computer imaging pioneer; 1991 MacArthur Fellowship for his work in educational animation
Katie Bouman (BS Electrical Engineering 2011), developer of the algorithm used in filtering the first images of a black hole taken by the Event Horizon Telescope
Lee Boysel (BSE EE 1962, MSE EE 1963), did pioneering work on Metal-oxide semiconductor transistors and systems during his years at IBM, Fairchild Semiconductor and McDonnell (now McDonnell-Douglas) Aerospace Corporation; founded Four-Phase Systems Inc., which produced the first LSI semiconductor memory system and the first LSI CPU; president, CEO and chairman of Four-Phase, which was purchased by Motorola in 1981
John Seely Brown (Ph.D. 1970), former Chief Scientist of Xerox, co-author of The Social Life of Information
Jim Buckmaster (MED: MDNG), President and CEO of Craigslist since November 2000; formerly its CTO and lead programmer
Alice Burks (M.A. 1957), author of children's books and books about the history of electronic computers
Arthur W. Burks (Ph.D. 1941),  member of the team that designed the Eniac computer as well as the IAS machine;frequent collaborator of John von Neumann; pioneer in computing education
Robert Cailliau (COE: MSc Computer, Information and Control Engineering 1971), co-developer of the World Wide Web; in 1974 he joined CERN as a Fellow in the Proton Synchrotron division, working on the control system of the accelerator; in 1987 became group leader of Office Computing Systems in the Data Handling division; in 1989, with Tim Berners-Lee, independently proposed a hypertext system for access to the CERN documentation, which led to a common proposal in 1990 and then to the World Wide Web; won the 1995 ACM Software System Award with Berners-Lee
Dick Costolo (LS&A: BA), former COO and former CEO of Twitter; founder of Feedburner, the RSS reader bought by Google in 2007
Edward S. Davidson, professor emeritus in Electrical Engineering and Computer Science at the University of Michigan; IEEE award winner
Paul Debevec (ENG: BA CSE), researcher in computer graphics at the University of Southern California's Institute for Creative Technologies; known for his pioneering work in high-dynamic-range imaging and image-based modelling and rendering; honored by the Academy of Motion Picture Arts and Sciences in 2010 with a Scientific and Engineering Academy Award
Tony Fadell (COE: BSE CompE 1991), "father" of the Apple iPod; created all five generations of the iPod and the Apple iSight camera
James D. Foley (Ph.D. 1969), professor at the Georgia Institute of Technology; co-author of several widely used textbooks in the field of computer graphics, of which over 300,000 copies are in print; ACM Fellow; IEEE Fellow; recipient of 1997 Steven A. Coons Award
Stephanie Forrest (Ph.D.), Professor of Computer Science at the University of New Mexico in Albuquerque; recipient of ACM - AAAI Allen Newell Award 2011
Lee Giles (M.S.), co-creator of CiteSeer; David Reese Professor of Information Sciences and Technology, Pennsylvania State University; ACM Fellow; IEEE Fellow
Greg Joswiak (B.S. CSE 1986) Senior Vice President, Worldwide Marketing, Apple, Inc., attributed with marketing original iPod, iPad and iPhone
John Henry Holland, first UM Computer Science PhD; originator of genetic algorithms
Larry Paul Kelley, founder of Shelby Gem Factory
Thomas Knoll (COE: BS EP 1982, MSE CI CE 1984), co-creator of Adobe Photoshop
Robert A. Kotick (MDNG), also known as Bobby Kotick; CEO, president, and a director of Activision Blizzard
John R. Koza (Ph.D. 1972), computer scientist; consulting professor at Stanford University; known for his work in pioneering the use of genetic programming for the optimization of complex problems
David Kuck (BS), professor at the Computer Science Department at the University of Illinois at Urbana-Champaign 1965–1993; IEEE award winner
Peter B. Lederman (BSE ChE' 1953, MSE 1957, Ph.D. 1961), director of the American Institute of Chemical Engineers foundation
Chris Langton (Ph.D.), computer science; "father of artificial life"; founder of the Swarm Corporation; distinguished expellee of the Santa Fe Institute
Eugene McAllaster (BS 1889), distinguished Seattle naval architect and marine engineer with his own firm, McAllaster & Bennett; designer of Seattle's historic fireboat Duwamish (1909); consulting engineer on Seattle's massive Denny Hill and Jackson Street regrades
Sid Meier, considered by some to be the "father of computer gaming"; created computer games Civilization, Pirates!, Railroad Tycoon, SimGolf
Kevin O'Connor (BS EE 1983), founder of DoubleClick, initially sold for $1.2 billion, and later acquired by Google for $3.1 billion
Kunle Olukotun (Ph.D.), pioneer of multi-core processors; professor of electrical engineering and computer science at Stanford University; director of the Pervasive Parallelism Laboratory at Stanford; IEEE award winner
Nneka Egbujiobi, lawyer and founder of Hello Africa
Larry Page (COE: BSE 1995), co-founder of Google; named a World Economic Forum Global Leader for Tomorrow (2002); member of the National Advisory Committee of the University of Michigan College of Engineering; with co-founder Sergey Brin, winner of 2004 Marconi Prize in 2004; trustee on the board of the X PRIZE; elected to the National Academy of Engineering in 2004
Eugene B. Power (BUS: BA 1927, MBA 1930); founder of University Microfilms Inc. (now ProQuest); K.B.E., hon.; president of the Power Foundation; honorary fellow of Magdalene College
Niels Provos (Ph.D.), researcher, secure systems and cryptography
Avi Rubin (Ph.D.), a leading authority on computer security; led the research team that successfully cracked the security code of Texas Instruments' RFID chip; holds eight patents for computer security-related inventions
Claude E. Shannon (COE: BS EE 1936, BA Math 1936), considered by some the "father of digital circuit design theory" and "father of information theory"; a paper drawn from his 1937 master's thesis, "A Symbolic Analysis of Relay and Switching Circuits", was published in the 1938 issue of the Transactions of the American Institute of Electrical Engineers; this won the 1940 Alfred Noble American Institute of American Engineers Award
Joseph Francis Shea (BS 1946, MS 1950, Ph.D. 1955), manager of the Apollo Spacecraft Program office during Project Apollo
Irma M. Wyman (COE: BS 1949), systems thinking tutor; first female CIO of Honeywell
Niklas Zennström, founder of Skype; has a dual degree in business and computer science from Uppsala University; spent his final year in the US at the University of Michigan
Linda Zhang (BS EE 1996, MBA 1998, MS 2011), chief engineer for the Ford F-150 Lightning

Turing, Ada Lovelace Award, and Grace Murray Hopper Award winners

Frances E. Allen (M.Sc. 1957), first woman to win the Turing Award (2006); IBM computer science veteran; honored by the Association for Computing Machinery for her work on program optimization and Ptran: program optimization work that led to modern methods for high-speed computing; winner of Ada Lovelace Award
Edgar F. Codd (Ph.D. 1965), mathematician; computer scientist; laid the theoretical foundation for relational databases; received the Turing Award in 1981
Stephen A. Cook (A.B. 1961); Turing Award 1982; formalised the notion of NP-completeness in a famous 1971 paper, "The Complexity of Theorem Proving Procedures"
Dorothy E. Denning ACM Fellow; The 2001 Augusta Ada Lovelace Award from the Assoc. for Women in Computing acknowledged "her outstanding in computer security and cryptography as well as her extraordinary contributions to national policy debates on cyber terrorism and information warfare
Margaret Hamilton (software engineer) 1986 winner of the Augusta Ada Lovelace Award
Bill Joy (COE: BSE CompE 1975, 2004 D.Eng. (Hon.)), co-founder of Sun Microsystems; given 1986 Grace Murray Hopper Award by the ACM for his work on the UNIX operating system
Jennifer Rexford (MSE 1993; Ph.D. 1996), winner of ACM's 2004 Grace Murray Hopper Award for outstanding young computer professional of the year
Michael Stonebraker, computer scientist and Turing award winner specializing in database research

Criminals, murderers, and infamous newsmakers
 Hawley Harvey Crippen (MED: 1882), infamous murderer; an American homeopath, ear and eye specialist and medicine dispenser. In 1910 he was hanged in Pentonville Prison in London, England, for the murder of his wife Cora Henrietta Crippen.
 François Duvalier (Public Health, 1944–45), repressive dictator of Haiti, excommunication from the Catholic Church; estimates of those killed by his regime are as high as 30,000.
 Theodore Kaczynski (Ph.D. 1967), better known as the Unabomber, one of UM's most promising mathematicians; earned his Ph.D. by solving, in less than a year, a math problem that his advisor had been unable to solve; abandoned his career to engage in a mail bombing campaign.
 Jack Kevorkian (MED: MD Pathology 1952), guilty of second-degree homicide after committing euthanasia by administering a lethal injection to Thomas Youk; spent eight years in prison
 John List, murderer and fugitive for eighteen years; caught after being featured in America's Most Wanted, died in prison. 
 Nathan F. Leopold, Jr., thrill killer of Leopold and Loeb, transferred from Michigan in 1922 to the University of Chicago, before murdering 14-year-old Robert "Bobby" Franks
 Richard A. Loeb (BA 1923), thrill killer of Leopold and Loeb, youngest graduate in the University of Michigan's history, murdered 14-year-old Robert "Bobby" Franks
 Larry Nassar (1985), USA national team doctor who sexually assaulted approximately 250 people
Herman Webster Mudgett, a.k.a. H.H. Holmes (MED: MD 1884), 19th-century serial killer; one of the first documented American serial killers; confessed to 27 murders, of which nine were confirmed; actual body count could be as high as 250; took an unknown number of his victims from the 1893 World's Columbian Exposition; his story was novelized by Erik Larson in his 2003 book The Devil in the White City

"Father of..."
John Jacob Abel (PHARM: Ph.D. 1883), North American "father of pharmacology"
Leon Jacob Cole (June 1, 1877 – February 17, 1948) was an American geneticist and ornithologist.  He is regarded as the father of American bird banding.
George Dantzig (MA Math 1937), father of linear programming; studied at UM under T.H. Hildebrandt, R.L. Wilder, and G.Y. Rainich
Tony Fadell (COE: BSE CompE 1991), "father" of the Apple iPod; created all five generations of the iPod and the Apple iSight camera
Moses Gomberg (February 8, 1866 – February 12, 1947) was a chemistry professor at the University of Michigan. Called the father of radical chemistry. 
Saul Hertz, M.D. (April 20, 1905 – July 28, 1950) was an American physician who devised the medical uses of radioactive iodine. Hertz pioneered the first targeted cancer therapies. Hertz is called the father of the field of theranostics, combining diagnostic imaging with therapy in a single chemical substance.
Ellis R. Kerley (September 1, 1924 – September 3, 1998) was an American anthropologist, and pioneer in the field of Forensic anthropology
Samuel Kirk (1904–1996) was an American psychologist and educator is recognized for his accomplishments in the field of special education, while sometimes being referred to as the “Father of Special Education”.
Chris Langton (Ph.D.), computer science; "father of artificial life"; founder of the Swarm Corporation; distinguished expellee of the Santa Fe Institute
Theodore C. Lyster, M.D. (10 July 1875 – 5 August 1933) was a United States Army physician and aviation medicine pioneer. "Father of aviation medicine".
Li Shouheng (Chinese: 李寿恒; pinyin: Lǐ Shòuhéng; 1898–1995), also known as S. H. Li, was a Chinese educator, chemist and chemical engineer. Li founded the first chemical engineering department in China, thus is regarded as the Father of Modern Chinese Chemical Engineering.
Sid Meier, considered by some to be the "father of computer gaming"; created computer games Civilization, Pirates!, Railroad Tycoon, SimGolf
Daniel Okrent (BA 1969), public editor of New York Times; editor-at-large of Time Inc.; Pulitzer Prize finalist in history (Great Fortune, 2004); founding father of Rotisserie League Baseball
Oyekunle Ayinde "Kunle" Olukotun is the Cadence Design Systems Professor in the Stanford School of Engineering, Professor of Electrical Engineering and Computer Science at Stanford University and the director of the Stanford Pervasive Parallelism Lab. Olukotun is known as the “father of the multi-core processor”
Robert E. Park Emory S. Bogardus acknowledges that Park is the father of human ecology, proclaiming, "Not only did he coin the name but he laid out the patterns, offered the earliest exhibit of ecological concepts, defined the major ecological processes and stimulated more advanced students to cultivate the fields of research in ecology than most other sociologists combined."
Raymond Pearl was an American biologist, regarded as one of the founders of biogerontology
John Clark Salyer II  he attended the University of Michigan where he received his MS in 1930. For his efforts as head of the Division of Wildlife Refuges, Salyer has become known as the "Father of the National Wildlife Refuge System".
Claude Shannon (April 30, 1916 – February 24, 2001) was an American mathematician, electrical engineer, and cryptographer known as "the father of information theory" and the "father of digital circuit design theory".
Richard Errett Smalley (June 6, 1943 – October 28, 2005) was the Gene and Norman Hackerman Professor of Chemistry and a Professor of Physics and Astronomy at Rice University. Upon Smalley's death, the US Senate passed a resolution to honor Smalley, crediting him as the "Father of Nanotechnology."
William A. Starrett, Jr. (June 14, 1877 – March 25, 1932) was an American builder and architect of skyscrapers. He was best known as the builder of the Empire State Building in New York City. He was once nicknamed the "father of the skyscraper".
Larry Teal (March 26, 1905 - July 11, 1984) is considered by many to be the father of American orchestral saxophone.
Olke Uhlenbeck is a biochemist. He is known for his work in RNA biochemistry and RNA catalysis. He completed his undergraduate degree at the University of Michigan at Ann Arbor in 1964. Some have called him the “Father of RNA.”
Mark Weiser (July 23, 1952 – April 27, 1999) was a computer scientist and chief technology officer (CTO) at Xerox PARC. Weiser is widely considered to be the father of ubiquitous computing
Wu Ta-You (simplified Chinese: 吴大猷; traditional Chinese: 吳大猷; pinyin: Wú Dàyóu) (September 27, 1907 – March 4, 2000) was a Chinese physicist and writer who worked in the United States, Canada, mainland China and Taiwan. He has been called the Father of Chinese Physics.

Founders and co-founders
The Admiral Group was founded by  Henry Engelhardt (B.A.), Chief Executive of Admiral Group, a British motor insurance company and English billionaire
Adobe Photoshop was founded by Thomas Knoll (COE)
Apollo 15 the all Michigan crew of Alfred Worden, David Scott (attended two years and later received honorary degree) and James Irwin left a 45-word plaque on the moon in 1971 founding its own chapter of the University of Michigan Alumni Association on the moon
Bain Capital was co-founded by founding partner Edward Conard (BSE 1978), 
 A co-founder and first president of the Boeing Company, Edgar Nathaniel Gott (May 2, 1887 – July 17, 1947) was an early American aviation industry executive who was a senior executive of several aircraft companies, including Fokker and Consolidated Aircraft.
Borders was co-founded by Louis Borders (BA 1969), who co-founded Borders along with his brother Tom Borders (MA 1966)
The Buffalo Bills, a team in the National Football League (NFL) were founded by  Ralph Wilson (LAW: Attended)
 Leo Burnett Company was founded by Leo Burnett (BA 1914), journalism and advertising pioneer 
 Buttonwood Development and Town Residential was co-founded by Andrew Heiberger, owner, and CEO
 C-SPAN was co-founded by John D. Evans
 DoubleClick Inc. was co-founded by Kevin O'Connor (COE: BSE EE 1983)
EQ Office, a real estate development firm was founded by Samuel Zell (LAW: AB 1963, JD 1966)
General Motors was co-founded in 1908 by Frederic Latta Smith. Smith was also one of the founders of the Olds Motor Works in 1899
Google was co-founded by Larry Page (COE)
Edwin Francis Gay was a founding member of the Council on Foreign Relations.
Groupon was co-founded by Brad Keywell (BUS: BBA 1991; LAW: JD 1993), principal of Groupon
Haworth, Inc., a manufacturer of office environments grew from a garage-shop venture in 1948 to a $1.4 billion global corporation and was co-founded by Gerrard Wendell "(G.W.)" Haworth
H&R Block Inc. was co-founded by Henry W. Bloch (BS 1944)
 LexION Capital Management was co-founded by Elle Kaplan (BA), CEO
Merrill Lynch was co-founded by Charles Edward Merrill (attended Law School from 1906-07 but did not graduate) 
The National Baseball Seminar was founded by Bill Gamson. When he moved to the University of Michigan in 1962, he recruited about 25 people to his game, including Robert Sklar, a history professor. In 1968, Professor Sklar mentioned it to Daniel Okrent, a student he was advising. A decade later, Mr. Okrent invented the more complex Rotisserie League Baseball, which lets its “owners” make in-season trades; it's considered the closest ancestor to today's billion-dollar fantasy sports industry.
Redbox was founded by Gregg Kaplan who is also the founder of Modjule LLC, and the former president and COO of Coinstar.
The Related Group was founded by  Stephen M. Ross (BUS: BBA 1962), real estate developer
Saba Capital Management was founded by hedge fund manager Boaz Weinstein (BA 1995), who specialized in credit derivatives trading
Science Applications International Corporation was founded by  J. Robert Beyster (COE: BSE, MS, Ph.D.), chairman, president, and CEO of
 The co-founder of Scientific Games Corporation, is John Koza (MA Mathematics 1966; BA 1964, MS 1966, Ph. D 1972 Computer Science), venture capitalist who co-invented the scratch-off instant lottery ticket
 Lockheed's Skunk Works was founded by Kelly Johnson (COE)
Syntel was founded by  Bharat Desai (BUS: MBA 1981), president, and CEO; Indian billionaire
Stryker Corporation, a medical device company, was founded by  Dr. Homer Stryker (MED: M.D. 1925; D. 1980)
Twilio was co-founded by Jeff Lawson who owns 5% of the $45 billion entity
The founder and CEO of Uptake Technologies, an industrial AI software provider is Brad Keywell (BUS: BBA 1991; LAW: JD 1993), serial entrepreneur
Wasserstein Perella & Co. was co-founded by Bruce Wasserstein (AB 1967), CEO of Lazard Freres

Educators
 Frank Aarebrot, professor of comparative politics at University of Bergen
Ida Louise Altman (A.B.), author of Emigrants and Society
Edgardo J. Angara (LAW: LLM 1964), Secretary of Agriculture (emeritus) and former Executive Secretary of the Philippines
W. Brian Arthur (MA 1969), Lagrange Prize in Complexity Science 2008; Schumpeter Prize in Economics 1990; Guggenheim Fellow 1987–88; Fellow of the Econometric Society
John "Jack" William Atkinson (Ph.D. 1950), psychologist who pioneered the scientific study of human motivation, achievement and behavior
Henry Moore Bates (Ph.B. 1890), dean of the University of Michigan Law School (1910–1939); Fellow of the American Academy of Arts and Sciences 
William J. Beal (A.B. 1859, A.M. 1862); namesake of W. J. Beal Botanical Garden
Mitchell Berman, professor of law at the University of Pennsylvania Law School
Mary Frances Berry; Geraldine R. Segal Professor of American Social Thought, professor of history at the University of Pennsylvania; Civil Rights Commissioner, 1980–2004
Lewis Binford Ph.D., archaeologist most known for his role in establishing the "New Archaeology" movement of the 1960s
Frank Nelson Blanchard (Ph.D. 1919), herpetologist and professor of zoology at the University of Michigan
Elise M. Boulding (Ph.D.), educator and author in the field of Peace & Conflict Studies
George W. Breslauer (A.B., A.M., Ph.D.), political science professor and Russia specialist at the University of California, Berkeley; Berkeley's executive vice chancellor and provost
Allen Britton (Ph.D. 1949), music educator; former president of Music Educators National Conference
Urie Bronfenbrenner (Ph.D. 1942), helped create the federal Head Start program; credited with creating the interdisciplinary field of human ecology
Frederic G. Cassidy (Ph.D. 1938), Editor-in-Chief of the Dictionary of American Regional English from 1962 to his death in 2000
June Rose Colby (Ph.D. 1886), professor of literature 1892–1931; first woman at the University of Michigan to receive a Ph.D. by examination
Katharine Coman (AB 1880), social activist and economist; specialized in the development of the American West;  professor of history 1883–1900; chaired the Economics Department; dean of Wellesley College, which named a professorship in her honor
Charles Horton Cooley (BA 1887; Ph.D. 1894), sociologist, most known for his concept of the "looking glass self", which expanded William James's idea of self to include the capacity of reflection on one's own behavior
Natalie Zemon Davis (Ph.D. 1959) , Canadian and American historian of the early modern period; awarded the 2010 Holberg International Memorial Prize, worth 4.5 million Norwegian kroner (~$700,000 US), for her narrative approach to the field of history
Bueno de Mesquita (Ph.D. 1971), political scientist and game theoretician
Paul Dressel (Ph.D.), founding director of Michigan State University's Counseling Center
James Stemble Duesenberry, economist; made a significant contribution to the Keynesian analysis of income and employment with his 1949 doctoral thesis "Income, Saving and the Theory of Consumer Behavior'
Aaron Dworkin (A.B. 1997, M.M. 1998), 2005 MacArthur Fellow; founder and president of Detroit-based Sphinx Organization, which strives to increase the number of African-Americans and Latinos having careers in classical music
W. Ralph Eubanks (M.A.), author, journalist, professor, public speaker, business executive, Guggenheim award winner
David Fasenfest (Ph.D. 1984), Associate Professor of Sociology at Wayne State University
Heidi Li Feldman (J.D. 1990; Ph.D. 1993), law professor
Sidney Fine, professor of history at Michigan
Neil Foley (Ph.D.), historian, Guggenheim award winner
Floyd J. Fowler, Jr. (M.A.1962; Ph.D 1966), researcher, academic, author and senior research fellow at Center for Survey Research at the University of Massachusetts Boston.
Joseph S. Freedman (Masters of Information and Library Science 1990), professor of education at Alabama State University
Helen Beulah Thompson Gaige (1890–1976), herpetologist, curator of Reptiles and Amphibians for the Museum of Zoology at the University of Michigan and specialist in neotropical frogs
Edwin Francis Gay (AB 1890), first Dean of Harvard Business School,  1908–1919
C. Lee Giles (M.S.), David Reese Professor of Information Sciences and Technology, Professor of Computer Science and Engineering, Professor of Supply Chain and Information Systems, Pennsylvania State University; Fellow of the ACM, IEEE and INNS
Roy Grow, Kellogg Professor of International Relations, director of the International Relations program at Carleton College; his specialty is the political economy of East Asia, specifically China and Southeast Asia
Jack Guttenberg, professor of law at Capital University Law School
Alice Hamilton (MED: MD 1893), toxicologist; scientist; first female faculty member at Harvard Medical School
Ann Tukey Harrison (BA 1957, PhD 1962), professor of French language and literature and Michigan State University
Elaine Catherine Hatfield (BA), professor of psychology at the University of Hawaii; earned Ph.D. at Stanford; scholar who pioneered the scientific study of passionate love and sexual desire
Shelley Haley, Professor of Classics and Africana Studies at Hamilton College
Jessica Hellmann (B.S.), Professor of Ecology at the University of Minnesota
Clark Leonard Hull (M.A.), psychologist
Lyman T. Johnson (AM 1931), the grandson of slaves; successfully sued to integrate the University of Kentucky, opening that state's colleges and universities to African-Americans five years before the landmark Brown v. Board of Education ruling
Michael P. Johnson (Ph.D. 1974), emeritus professor of sociology, Pennsylvania State University
Rosabeth Moss Kanter (MA 1965, Ph.D. 1967), first tenured female professor at Harvard Business School
Roberta Karmel (born 1937), Centennial Professor of Law at Brooklyn Law School, and first female Commissioner of the U.S. Securities and Exchange Commission.
Nafe Katter (BA, MA, PhD), professor of Theatre at the University of Connecticut and frequent stage actor and director
Mark Kilstofte (D.M.A. 1992), composer; professor at Furman University, Greenville, South Carolina; Guggenheim award winner
George Kish (Ph.D.), cartographer
Edgar Lane (Ph.D. 1949), professor of political science University of California Santa Barbara and author
John E. Laird (B.S. 1975), computer scientist
Thomas A. LaVeist (MA 1985, PhD 1988, PDF 1990), Dean and Weatherhead Presidential Chair in Health Equity at Tulane University School of Public Health & Tropical Medicine
Stanley Lebergott (BA, MA), former government economist; Wesleyan University professor
Rensis Likert (B.A. 1926 in Sociology and Economics), founder of the University of Michigan Institute for Social Research and the director from its inception in 1946–1970
Lynda Lisabeth Professor in the school of Public Health of Michigan University.
Howard Markel (A.B., English Literature, 1982; M.D., 1986), George E. Wantz Distinguished Professor of the History of Medicine at the University of Michigan, Guggenheim Fellow, Member of the National Academy of Medicine, author, pediatrician, medical journalist
William McAndrew (B.A., Literature, 1886), superintendent of Chicago Public Schools
Nina McClelland (PhD., 1968), dean emeritus and former professor of chemistry at the University of Toledo. Fellow of the American Chemical Society
Paul Robert Milgrom (A.B. 1970), economist
Martha Minow (LS&A: A.B. 1975), named Dean of Harvard Law School in 2009
James Moeser (Ph.D. 1967), ninth chancellor of the University of North Carolina at Chapel Hill, 2000–present
Mayo Moran (LAW: LLM 1992), named Dean of the University of Toronto Faculty of Law in 2005
Marjorie Hope Nicolson (A.B. 1914), first female President of Phi Beta Kappa, Guggenheim award winner
Eugene A. Nida (Ph.D.), linguist, developer of the dynamic-equivalence Bible-translation theory
Nicholas Nixon (B.A. 1969), photographer, known for portraiture and documentary photography, and for championing the use of the 8x10 inch view camera; Guggenheim award winner
Mary Beth Norton (B.A. 1964), American historian; Mary Donlon Alger Professor of American History, Department of History at Cornell University; Guggenheim award winner
Norman Ornstein (MA Political Science, PhD 1974 Political Science), Scholar: Center for Advanced Study in the Behavioral Sciences, Stanford University.
Scott E. Page (B.A. 1985), social scientist
Clara Claiborne Park (1923–2010), instructor at Williams College; author; raised awareness of autism
Michael Posner (PhD), psychologist; winner of the National Medal of Science
John Oren Reed (1856–1916), Ph.D. at Jena (1897); professor of physics
Shai Reshef (M.A.), Israeli businessman; educational entrepreneur; founder and president of University of the People, a non-profit, tuition-free, online academic institution dedicated to the democratization of higher education
John Ruhl (BS Physics 1987), professor of physics at UCSB and Case Western Reserve University; primary investigator of the ACBAR, Boomerang, South Pole Telescope, and Spider Telescope projects; author of Princeton Problems in Physics
Lucy Maynard Salmon (B.A. 1876, M.A. 1883), American historian; professor of history, Vassar College, 1889–1927; member of the American Historical Association's Committee of Seven
Floyd VanNest Schultz (Ph.D. EE 1950), Educator and Electrical Engineering Scientist
Robert Scott (LAW: SJD 1973), Dean University of Virginia School of Law 1991–2000
Wilfrid Sellars (B.A. 1933), philosopher and Rhodes Scholar
Al Siebert (M.A., Ph.D. 1965), Menninger Fellow; Resiliency Center Director; author of The Resiliency Advantage: Master Change, Bounce Back from Setbacks, awarded the 2006 Independent Publishers' award for Best Self-Help Book
Holly Martin Smith, distinguished professor of philosophy at Rutgers University
Claude Steiner (Ph.D. 1965), founding member and teaching fellow of the International Transactional Analysis Association
Clarence Stephens (Pd.D.); the teaching techniques he introduced at Potsdam, and earlier at Morgan State, have been adopted by many mathematics departments across the country
George Sugihara (B.S. 1973), theoretical biologist; has worked across a wide variety of fields, including landscape ecology, algebraic topology, algal physiology and paleoecology, neurobiology, atmospheric science, fisheries science, and quantitative finance
Leonard Suransky, winner of the Des Lee Visiting Lectureship in Global Awareness at Webster University
G. David Tilman (Ph.D. 1976), ecologist, Guggenheim award winner
Amos Tversky (Ph.D. 1965), long-time collaborator with Daniel Kahneman; co-founder of prospect theory in economics; died of cancer before Kahneman received the Nobel prize and was featured prominently and fondly in his Nobel speech
Zalman Usiskin (Ph.D.), educator; Director of the University of Chicago School Mathematics Project
Robert W. Vishny (AB, highest distinction, 1981), economist and the Eric J. Gleacher Distinguished Service Professor of Finance at the University of Chicago Graduate School of Business; prominent representative of the school of behavioural finance; his research papers (many written jointly with Andrei Shleifer, Rafael LaPorta and Josef Lakonishok) are among the most often cited recent research works in the field of economic sciences
 Robert M. Warner (MA 1953, Ph.D.), dean emeritus, University of Michigan's School of Information (the former School of Library Science) 1985–92; professor emeritus of the School of Information; appointed sixth archivist of the United States in July 1980 by President Jimmy Carter; continued to serve under President Ronald Reagan through April 15, 1985
Albert H. Wheeler (SPH: Ph.D.), life-sciences professor and politician in Ann Arbor; the city's first African-American mayor, 1975–1978; became assistant professor of microbiology and immunology at Michigan in 1952; eventually became the university's first tenured African-American professor
David E. Weinstein (LS&A: MA 1988, Ph.D. 1991), Carl Sumner Shoup Professor of the Japanese Economy at Columbia University; contributed to new understanding of variety gains from international trade; expert on the Japanese economy; Research Director of the Japan Project at the National Bureau of Economic Research; Member of the Council on Foreign Relations; Member of the Federal Economic Statistics Advisory Committee 
Phyllis Wise (M.S. 1969, Ph.D. 1972), University of Washington provost or Chief Academic officer; manages $3 billion annual budget
Frank Wu (LAW: JD 1991), named Dean of Hastings Law School in 2009
Bret Weinstein (MA, Ph.D. 2009), professor at Evergreen State College until 2017

University presidents
Theophilus C. Abbot (LL.D. 1890), third President of Michigan State University
Charles Kendall Adams (1861, 1862), historian; second President of Cornell University (1885–1892); President of the University of Wisconsin (1892–1902)
James Rowland Angell (BA 1890), tenth President of Yale University
Dr. Khaled S. Al-Sultan (MS, applied mathematics; COE: Ph.D. in IOE), third rector of King Fahd University for Petroleum and Minerals, a public university in Dhahran, Saudi Arabia
Charles E. Bayless (MBA), president of West Virginia University Institute of Technology
Warren E. Bow (M.A.), president of Wayne State University
Detlev Bronk (Ph.D. 1926), scientist, educator, and administrator; credited with establishing biophysics as a recognized discipline; President of Johns Hopkins; president of The Rockefeller University from 1953 to 1968. 
Stratton D. Brooks (BA 1896), president of the University of Oklahoma and the University of Missouri
Gaylen J. Byker (LAW: JD), President of Calvin College; Offshore Energy Development Corporation Partners
William Wallace Campbell (COE: BSE 1886), astronomer; tenth president of the University of California (1923–30); elected president of the National Academy of Sciences in 1931er, head of Dev
Benjamin Cluff (B.A.), first president of Brigham Young University; the school's third principal
Joanne V. Creighton (Ph.D. in English literature), 17th president of Mount Holyoke College in South Hadley, Massachusetts; provost and professor of English 1990–1994 at Wesleyan University; Wesleyan's interim president 1994–1995
James Danko (MBA), appointed 21st president of Butler University in 2011
John DiBiaggio (MA), president, University of Connecticut 1979–1985, Michigan State University 1985–1992, Tufts University 1992–2001
Saul Fenster (Ph.D., 1959), 6th President of New Jersey Institute of Technology 1978–2002
Lewis Ransom Fiske (A.B. 1850; A.M.; LL.D. 1879), second president of the Agricultural College of the State of Michigan (now Michigan State University) 1859–1862; president of Albion College 1877–1898
Deborah Freund (MPH, MA, Ph.D.), president of Claremont Graduate University
David Friday, president of the U.S. state of Michigan's Michigan Agricultural College (now Michigan State University), 1922–1923; graduate of the University of Michigan
Allan Gilmour (academic) (MBA), inaugurated as 11th president of Wayne State University in 2011
Domenico Grasso (Ph.D. 1987), Sixth Chancellor of University of Michigan-Dearborn
Thomas J. Haas, president, Grand Valley State University
Eugene Habecker (Ph.D.), 30th president of Taylor University
William W. Hagerty (COE:M.S. 1943, Ph.D. 1947), former president of Drexel University
Cindy Hill, Wyoming Superintendent of Public Instruction since 2011, received master's degree from the University of Michigan
Harry Burns Hutchins; fourth president of the University of Michigan (1909–1920); organized and led the law department at Cornell University from 1887 to 1894
Mark Kennedy is an American businessman, politician, and administrator currently serving as the president of the University of Colorado (CU) system. Previously he served as 12th president of the University of North Dakota,
Raynard S. Kington (MED), former deputy director of the National Institutes of Health; 13th president of Grinnell College; earned medical degree from the University of Michigan at age 21
Bradford Knapp was the president of the Alabama Polytechnic Institute, now known as Auburn University from 1928 to 1933.
Kathy Krendl, president, Otterbein College (Ohio)
James Raymond Lawson (Ph.D.), president, Fisk University (1967–1975)
Jeffrey S. Lehman (LAW: JD 1977), 11th President of Cornell University (2003–2005)
Wallace D. Loh (Ph.D.), president University of Maryland
Maud Mandel, Professor of History and Judaic Studies and Dean of the College at Brown University; president of Williams College
Harriet Nembhard (COE: Ph.D.) was Dean of the University of Iowa College of Engineering and The Roy J. Carver Professor of Industrial and Systems Engineering. Beginning July 1, 2023, she will become the President of Harvey Mudd College in Claremont, California.
Carroll Vincent Newsom (1904–1990) was an American educator who served as the eleventh NYU President
Moses Ochonu, professor of African History at Vanderbilt University
Alice Elvira Freeman Palmer (A.B. 1876, Ph.D. Hon 1882), appointed head of the history department at Wellesley College in 1879; named the acting president of Wellesley in 1881; became its president in 1882
Constantine Papadakis (Ph.D.), Drexel University President 1995–2009
William H. Payne (1836–1907), chancellor of the University of Nashville and President of Peabody College (both of which later merged with Vanderbilt University), 1887–1901
Scott Ransom, president, University of North Texas Health Science Center
William Craig Rice, president, Shimer College
Henry Wade Rogers (BA, MA) was President of Northwestern University from 1890 to 1900. 
Jonathan Rosenbaum, President of Gratz College
Alexander Grant Ruthven (Ph.D. 1906); president of the University of Michigan
Austin Scott, tenth President of Rutgers College (now Rutgers University), 1891–1906
William Spoelhof (MA 1937), President of Calvin College 1951–76; namesake of Asteroid 129099 Spoelhof
Rudolf Steinberg  from 2000 to 2008 was president of the Johann Wolfgang Goethe University in Frankfurt.
Carl Strikwerda (Ph.D.), William & Mary's Dean of the Faculty of Arts & Sciences; named 14th president of Elizabethtown College in Pennsylvania in 2011
Beverly Daniel Tatum, president, Spelman College
Charles M. Vest, president, National Academy of Engineering; former president, MIT
B. Joseph White (BUS: Ph.D. 1975), 16th president of the University of Illinois
Jerome Wiesner (COE: BS 1937, MS 1938, Ph.D. 1950), MIT Provost 1968–1971; President of MIT 1971–1980
Edwin Willits (A.B. 1855), the first Assistant U.S. Secretary of Agriculture under Norman Jay Coleman for Grover Cleveland's first administration; 4th President of Michigan Agricultural College
Richard F. Wilson (ED 1978), president, Illinois Wesleyan University

Fiction, nonfiction
See List of University of Michigan arts alumni.

Fictional Wolverines
In 24, Nadia Yassir has a B.A. in Languages from the university.
In, 321 Days in Michigan,  the story of Antonio Chico García (Chico García as Antonio), a young and successful executive, condemned to go to prison because of white collar crimes. In order to hide this fact, he pretends he is spending time at the University of Michigan working on a master's degree. 
In Ally McBeal, the character Billy, played by Gil Bellows, is a Michigan student.
In A Tree Grows in Brooklyn by Betty Smith, Francie prepares to take classes at the University of Michigan.
In Air Force One, U.S. President James Marshall, played by Harrison Ford, attended the University of Michigan.
In The Americans, the character "Kimmy" is played as a junior at Michigan
In American Pie and other films in the series, Kevin Myers, played by Thomas Ian Nicholas, attends Michigan.
In Answer This!, Christopher Gorham plays UM student Paul Tarson.
In Bad Company, Laurence Fishburne plays a corrupt intelligence analyst who is a Michigan graduate.
In Blindspot, Rob Brown plays an FBI agent and former Michigan student-athlete.
In The Big Chill, Michael Gold, played by Jeff Goldblum, worked at The Michigan Daily.
In The Chamber, Chris O'Donnell plays a Michigan educated attorney defending a death penalty case.
In The Company You Keep, Brit Marling plays a University of Michigan Law student.
In Continental Divide, Allen Garfield plays the role of Max Bernbaum, an All-American football player from Michigan.
In Crisis, Gary Oldman plays reputationally resurrected biochemist who is hired by Michigan.
In Entourage, Ari Gold, earned his J.D./M.B.A at the Ross School of Business.
In The Five Year Engagement, Emily Blunt plays UM student Violet Barnes, a post-doctoral fellow in psychology.
In Freaks and Geeks, Lindsay leaves for the academic summit at the University of Michigan.
In Ghostbusters (2016), Melissa McCarthy plays Abby Yates, a University of Michigan graduate.
In The Good Place, one of the Eleanor Shellstrops, is a graduate of Michigan Law. 
In The Green Lantern, Guy Gardner, is a superhero alum who double majored in education and psychology. He played football with another superhero, Steel.
In House, Dr. Gregory House earned his M.D. from Michigan's medical school. Lisa Cuddy, played by Lisa Edelstein, was in the pre-med program at Michigan.
In Justified, Neal McDonough plays former UM MBA Robert Quarles, a violent sociopath.
In Last Man Standing, Tim Allen plays Mike Baxter, a University of Michigan graduate and the highly opinionated marketing director for a chain of sporting goods stores.
In Lost, the Dharma Initiative was founded in 1970 by two doctoral candidates, Gerald and Karen DeGroot, while studying at the university.
In Love and Honor, Teresa Palmer plays an undergraduate caught up in the movement to end the war in Vietnam.
In Mad Men, "Smitty" Smith (Patrick Cavanaugh) tells one of his fellow characters that he is a graduate of the University of Michigan.
In MacGyver, Levy Tran plays the latest addition to the Phoenix team.
In The Millionaire, Barbara "Babs" Alden (Evalyn Knapp) and William “Bill” Merrick (David Manners) meet at a University of Michigan dance and later in the film become involved.
In No Strings Attached, Adam Franklin, played by Ashton Kutcher, and Emma Kurtzman, played by Natalie Portman, both attended the university.
In Parks & Recreation, Chris Traeger, announces he and his partner Ann are moving to Ann Arbor because he has "a job lined up at the University of Michigan". 
In Perception, Kelly Rowan  who plays the character Dr. Caroline Newsome/Natalie Vincent, a University of Michigan Medical school graduate.
In Sister, Sister, Tia Landry, played by Tia Mowry, attends the University of Michigan.
In Sleeping with Other People, Alison Brie plays a woman who becomes an aspiring medical student at the University of Michigan.
In The Sopranos, Ronald Zellman, played by Peter Riegert, is a Michigan graduate.
In The West Wing, Leo McGarry, played by John Spencer, attended the University of Michigan.
In Shameless, Jimmy/Steve, played by Justin Chatwin, attended the University of Michigan.
In True Believer, the character Roger Baron, played by Robert Downey Jr., is a Michigan Law graduate.
In The Upside of Anger, Keri Russell plays Emily Wolfmeyer, an aspiring dancer.
In Why Him?, Megan Mullally plays the Michigan-educated mother of the lead character.

Finance

Peter Borish, investor and trader

Foodies
Rick Bayless (doctoral student, linguistics), chef who specializes in traditional Mexican cuisine with modern interpretations; known for his PBS series Mexico: One Plate at a Time
David Burtka is an American actor and professional chef. 
Gael Greene, food critic, said to have created the coinage "foodie", as found in the Foodie article.
Gabrielle Hamilton chef, author, winner of James Beard Award
Stephanie Izard, is an American chef residing in Chicago, Illinois, best known as the first female chef to win Bravo's Top Chef
Sara Moulton (AB 1974), executive chef of Gourmet magazine; former host of the Food Network shows Sara's Secrets and Cooking Live
Joan Nathan, She was executive producer and host of Jewish Cooking in America with Joan Nathan
Ruth Reichl food writer, chef, critic and winner of four James Beard Awards

Fulbright Scholars
Since the inaugural class in 1949, Harvard, Yale, Berkeley, Columbia, and the University of Michigan have been the top producers of U.S. Student Program scholars. As of 2021, Michigan has been the leading producer since 2005.

Barry M. Goldwater Scholarship
Since 1989, 89 Michigan students have received the prestigious Goldwater Scholarship, one of the largest cohort's in the country and second only to Stanford in the last 10 years.

	2022 	Nick Cemalovic
	2022 	Faye Jackson
	2022 	Daniel Liu
	2022 	Jonah Nan
	2022 	Anna Simpson
	2021 	Henry Fleischmann
	2021 	Jack Haviland 
	2021 	Sophie Kriz 
	2021 	Karthik Ravi
	2020 	Sabrina Corsetti 
	2020 	Jacob Florian
	2020 	Matthew Nelson
	2020 	Alexander Wang
	2019 	Anna Argento
	2019 	Jenna Manske
	2019 	Noah Luntzlara
	2018 	Tali Khain
	2018 	Noah McNeal
	2018 	Carolyn Suh
	2018 	Eric Winsor
	2017 	Andrew Gitlin
	2017 	Thomas Garton
	2016 	Gwyn Moreland
	2016 	James Lawniczak
	2015 	Alex Golinski
	2015 	Jonathan Haefner
	2015 	Karl Winsor
	2014 	Joseph Richey
	2014 	Aaron Priluck
	2013 	Elliot Aaron Wells
	2013 	Raymond J. Strobel
	2013 	Joshua Bruce Kurtz
	2012 	Charles Henry Stibitz
	2012 	David Alred Sherman
	2011 	Nicholas Triantafillou
	2011 	Sean Michael Collins
	2011 	Alexander J. Carney
	2010 	Michelle L. Robinette
	2010 	Ray Zhang
	2009 	Sarah Kostinski
	2009 	Katherine Bouman
	2009 	Daniel Hermes
	2008 	Steven Moses
	2008 	Timothy Heath
	2007 	Eszter Zavodszky
	2007 	Kevin Hayes Wilson
	2006 	Kathryn MacKool
	2006 	Matthew Becker
	2005 	Pratik Rohatgi
	2005 	Eric Chanowski
	2004 	Daniel Schmidt
	2004 	Jacob Bourjaily
	2003 	Bethany Percha
	2003 	Jason Kriesel
	2003 	Christopher Hayward
	2002 	Semyon Zharkin
	2002 	Michael Rodehorst
	2002 	Alefiyah Mesiwala
	2002 	Shaili Jain
	2001 	Sarah Uhler Morton
	2001 	Raj Gupta
	2001 	Martha Coselmon
	2000 	Benjamin Singer
	2000 	Joseph Marsano
	2000 	Brian DeBosch
	2000 	Jennifer Chang
	1999 	Cherianne Milne
	1999 	Todd Coleman
	1998 	David White
	1998 	Scott Lefurgy
	1998 	Aaron Leanhardt
	1997 	Elisa Pease
	1997 	Joseph Dertouzos
	1997 	Douglas Covert
	1996 	Rahul Kohli
	1996 	Andrew Haidle
	1995 	Jeffrey Smithers
	1995 	Melody Klaus
	1994 	Adam Pacal
	1994 	Vikas Mehta
	1993 	Dana T. Virgo
	1993 	John Santini
	1993 	Douglas Daniels
	1992 	Evan McLain
	1992 	Valarie Benezra
	1991 	Michael Weiss
	1991 	Ariel Smits
	1991 	Beverly Aist
	1989 	Mark J. Schiefsky

Guggenheim fellows
As of 2021, Michigan alumni include over 145 Guggenheim Fellows.

Richard Newbold Adams (August 4, 1924 – September 11, 2018) was an American anthropologist.
Thomas R. Adams (May 22, 1921 – December 1, 2008) was librarian of the John Carter Brown Library and John Hay Professor of Bibliography and University Bibliographer at Brown University.
Ricardo Ainslie is a Mexican-American documentary filmmaker.
John Richard Alden (23 January 1908, Grand Rapids, Michigan – 14 August 1991, Clearwater, Florida) was an American historian and author of a number of books on the era of the American Revolutionary War.
W. Brian Arthur (born 31 July 1945) is an economist credited with developing the modern approach to increasing returns.
John William Atkinson (December 31, 1923 – October 27, 2003), also known as Jack Atkinson, was an American psychologist who pioneered the scientific study of human motivation, achievement and behavior.
Dean Bakopoulos is an American writer, born in Dearborn Heights, Michigan in 1975. He is a two-time National Endowment for the Arts fellow, a Guggenheim Fellow,  and writer-in-residence at Grinnell College.
John Bargh (/ˈbɑːrdʒ/; born 1955) is a social psychologist currently working at Yale University
Leslie Bassett was an American composer of classical music.
Richard Bauman is a folklorist and anthropologist, now retired from Indiana University Bloomington. He is distinguished professor emeritus of folklore, of anthropology, and of communication and culture.
Warren Benson (January 26, 1924 – October 6, 2005) was an American composer. His compositions consist mostly of music for wind instruments and percussion. 
Theodore H. Berlin (8 May 1917, New York City – 16 November 1962, Baltimore) was an American theoretical physicist.
Derek Bermel (born 1967, in New York City) is an American composer, clarinetist and conductor whose music blends various facets of world music, funk and jazz with largely classical performing forces and musical vocabulary.
Robert Berner (November 25, 1935 – January 10, 2015) was an American scientist known for his contributions to the modeling of the carbon cycle.
Sara Berry (born 1940) is an American scholar of contemporary African political economies, professor of history at Johns Hopkins University and co-founder of the Center for Africana Studies at Johns Hopkins.
Lawrence D. Bobo is the W. E. B. Du Bois Professor of the Social Sciences and the Dean of Social Science at Harvard University. 
Kevin Boyle (historian) (7 October 1960) is an American author and the William Smith Mason Professor of American History at Northwestern University. 
Bertrand Harris Bronson (June 22, 1902 – March 14, 1986) was an American academic and professor in the English department at the University of California, Berkeley.
Clair Alan Brown (born August 16, 1903; died 1982) was an American botanist.
Roger Brown (psychologist) (April 14, 1925 – December 11, 1997) was an American psychologist. He was known for his work in social psychology and in children's language development.
Eugene Burnstein is an American social psychologist and professor emeritus of psychology at the University of Michigan College of Literature, Science, and the Arts.
John W. Cahn was an American scientist and recipient of the 1998 National Medal of Science.
David George Campbell (born January 28, 1949 in Decatur, Illinois, United States) is an American educator, ecologist, environmentalist, and award-winning author of non-fiction.
Victoria Chang is an American poet and children's writer. Her fifth book of poems, OBIT, was published by Copper Canyon Press in 2020.
Patricia Cheng (born 1952) is a Chinese American psychologist.
Laura Clayton (born December 8, 1943) is an American pianist and composer. She was born in Lexington, Kentucky, and studied at the Peabody Conservatory in Baltimore and at Columbia University, New York, with Mario Davidovsky.
Allan M. Collins is an American cognitive scientist, Professor Emeritus of Learning Sciences at Northwestern University's School of Education and Social Policy. 
Philip  Converse (November 17, 1928 – December 30, 2014) was an American political scientist.
Richard M. Cook is an American academic who specializes in American literature. 
Harold Courlander (September 18, 1908 – March 15, 1996) was an American novelist, folklorist, and anthropologist and an expert in the study of Haitian life.
Olena Kalytiak Davis (born September 16, 1963) is an American poet.
Philip James DeVries (born March 7, 1952) is a tropical biologist whose research focuses on insect ecology and evolution, especially butterflies. 
Charles L. Dolph (August 27, 1918 – June 1, 1994) was a professor of mathematics, known for his research in applied mathematics and engineering.
William Doppmann (Springfield, Massachusetts, October 10, 1934 — Honokaa, Hawaii, January 27, 2013) was an American concert pianist and composer. 
William H. Durham a biological anthropologist and evolutionary biologist,[1][2] is the Bing Professor Emeritus in Human Biology at Stanford University
W. Ralph Eubanks (born June 25, 1957) is an American author, journalist, professor, public speaker, and business executive. 
Avard Fairbanks (March 2, 1897 – January 1, 1987) was a 20th-century American sculptor.
Ada Ferrer is a Cuban-American historian. She is Julius Silver Professor of History and Latin American Studies at New York University.
Sidney Fine (historian) (October 11, 1920 – March 31, 2009) was a professor of history at the University of Michigan.
Neil Foley is an American historian.
Gabriela Lena Frank (born Berkeley, California, United States, September 1972) is an American pianist and composer of contemporary classical music.
Steven Frank (biologist) (born 1957) is a professor of biology at the University of California, Irvine. 
William Frankena (June 21, 1908 – October 22, 1994) was an American moral philosopher.
Ronald Freedman was an international demographer and founder of the Population Studies Center at the University of Michigan.
Douglas J. Futuyma (born 24 April 1942) is an American evolutionary biologist. 
Neal Gabler (born 1950) is an American journalist, writer and film critic.
Mary Gaitskill (born November 11, 1954) is an American novelist, essayist, and short story writer. 
David Gale was an American mathematician and economist.
William A. Gamson was a professor of Sociology at Boston College, where he was also the co-director of the Media Research and Action Project (MRAP).
Seymour Ginsburg (December 12, 1927 – December 5, 2004) was an American pioneer of automata theory, formal language theory, and database theory, in particular; and computer science
Charles R. Goldman (born 9 November 1930 in Urbana, Illinois) is an American limnologist and ecologist.
Francisco Goldman (born 1954) is an American novelist, journalist, and Allen K. Smith Professor of Literature and Creative Writing, Trinity College.
Leslie D. Gottlieb (1936–2012) was a US biologist described by the Botanical Society of America as "one of the most influential plant evolutionary biologists over the past several decades.".
Josh Greenfeld was an author and screenwriter mostly known for his screenplay for the 1974 film Harry and Tonto along with Paul Mazursky
Gwendolyn Midlo Hall (born June 27, 1929) is an American historian who focuses on the history of slavery in the Caribbean, Latin America, Louisiana (United States), Africa, and the African Diaspora in the Americas.
Amy Harmon is an American journalist.
Joel F. Harrington (born August 25, 1959) is an American historian of pre-modern Germany. He is currently Centennial Professor of History at Vanderbilt University.
Donald Harris (composer) (April 7, 1931, in St. Paul, Minnesota  – March 29, 2016, in Columbus, Ohio) was an American composer who taught music at The Ohio State University for 22 years. He was Dean of the College of the Arts from 1988 to 1997.
Garrett Hongo (born May 30, 1951, Volcano, Hawai'i) is a Yonsei, fourth-generation Japanese American academic and poet.
Joseph Hickey (16 April 1907 - 31 August 1993) was an American ornithologist who wrote the landmark Guide to Bird Watching
Isabel V. Hull (born 1949) is John Stambaugh Professor Emerita of History and the former chair of the history department at Cornell University. 
Philip Strong Humphrey (26 February 1926, Hibbing, Minnesota – 13 November 2009, Lawrence, Kansas) was an ornithologist, museum curator, and professor of zoology.
M. Kent Jennings (born 1934) is an American political scientist best known for his path-breaking work on the patterns and development of political preferences and behaviors among young Americans.
Lawrence Joseph (born 1948 in Detroit, Michigan) is an American poet, writer, essayist, critic, lawyer, and professor of law.
James B. Kaler (born December 29, 1938 in Albany, New York) is an American astronomer and science writer.
Rosabeth Moss Kanter (born March 15, 1943) is the Ernest L. Arbuckle professor of business at Harvard Business School.
Laura Kasischke (born 1961) is an American fiction writer and poet. She is best known for writing the novels Suspicious River, The Life Before Her Eyes and White Bird in a Blizzard
Mike Kelley (artist), (October 27, 1954 – c. January 31, 2012) was an American artist. 
Aviva Kempner (born December 23, 1946) is an American filmmaker. 
James Stark Koehler (10 November 1914 in Oshkosh, Wisconsin – 19 June 2006 in Urbana, Illinois) was an American physicist, specializing in metal defects and their interactions. He is known for the eponymous Peach-Koehler stress formula.
Timothy Kramer (born 1959) is an American composer whose music has earned him a Fulbright Scholarship, an NEA grant, and a Guggenheim Fellowship.
Edward Kravitz (born December 19, 1932) is the George Packer Berry Professor of Neurobiology at Harvard Medical School.
Armin Landeck (1905–1984) was an American printmaker and educator.
Chihchun Chi-sun Lee (Chinese: 李志純; Pe̍h-ōe-jī: Lí Chì-sûn; Pinyin: Li Zhìchún, born 1970) is a composer of contemporary classical music. 
Otis Hamilton Lee (28 September 1902, Montevideo, Minnesota – 17 September 1948, Vermont) was an American philosopher, noteworthy as a Guggenheim Fellow.
Normand Lockwood (March 19, 1906 – March 9, 2002) was an American composer born in New York, New York. 
Alvin D. Loving Jr. (September 19, 1935 – June 21, 2005), better known as Al Loving, was an African-American abstract expressionist painter. 
Mary Lum (artist) (born 1951) is an American visual artist
Suzanne McClelland is a New York-based artist best known for abstract work based in language, speech, and sound.
Jay Meek (1937 – November 3, 2007 St. Paul) was an American poet, and director of the Creative Writing program at the University of North Dakota.
Jonathan Metzl (born December 12, 1964) is an American psychiatrist and author.
Nancy Milford (born March 26, 1938) is an American biographer.
Harvey Alfred Miller (October 19, 1928, Sturgis, Michigan – January 7, 2020, Palm Bay, Florida) was an American botanist, specializing in Pacific Islands bryophytes.
Susan Montgomery (born 2 April 1943 in Lansing, MI) is a distinguished American mathematician whose current research interests concern noncommutative algebras
Howard Markel (born April 23, 1960) is an American physician and medical historian. 
George H. Miley (born 1933) is a professor emeritus of physics from the University of Illinois at Urbana–Champaign.
Christine Montross (born 1973) is an American medical doctor and writer.
Paul M. Naghdi (March 29, 1924 – July 9, 1994) was a professor of mechanical engineering at University of California, Berkeley.
Homer Neal (June 13, 1942 – May 23, 2018) was an American particle physicist and a distinguished professor at the University of Michigan.
Marjorie Hope Nicolson was an American literary scholar.
Harald Herborg Nielsen (January 25, 1903 – January 8, 1973) was an American physicist.
Nicholas Nixon (born October 27, 1947) is a photographer, known for his work in portraiture and documentary photography
Richard Nonas (January 3, 1936 – May 11, 2021) was an American anthropologist and post-minimalist sculptor.
Mary Beth Norton (born 1943) is an American historian, specializing in American colonial history and well known for her work on women's history and the Salem witch trials.
Pat Oleszko is an American visual and performing artist.
Susan Orlean (born October 31, 1955) is a journalist and bestselling author of The Orchid Thief and The Library Book.
Peter Orner is an American writer. He is the author of two novels, two story collections and a book of essays. 
Scott E. Page is an American social scientist and John Seely Brown Distinguished University Professor of Complexity, Social Science, and Management at the University of Michigan
Douglass Parker (May 27, 1927 – February 8, 2011) was an American classicist, academic, and translator.
Doug Peacock is an American naturalist, outdoorsman, and author. 
Vivian Perlis (April 26, 1928 – July 4, 2019) was an American musicologist and the founder and former director of Yale University's Oral History of American Music.
Elizabeth J. Perry, is an American scholar of Chinese politics and history at Harvard University, where she is the Henry Rosovsky Professor of Government and director of the Harvard-Yenching Institute. 
Alvin Plantinga (born November 15, 1932) is an American analytic philosopher who works primarily in the fields of philosophy of religion, epistemology (particularly on issues involving epistemic justification), and logic.
Michael Posner (psychologist) is an American psychologist who is a researcher in the field of attention, and the editor of numerous cognitive and neuroscience compilations.
Richard Prum (born 1961) is William Robertson Coe Professor of ornithology, and head curator of vertebrate zoology at the Peabody Museum of Natural History at Yale University.
Rayna Rapp (pen name Rayna R. Reiter) is a professor and associate chair of anthropology at New York University, specializing in gender and health
Bertram Raven (September 26, 1926 – February 26, 2020) was an American academic. He was a member of the faculty of the psychology department at UCLA from 1956 until his death. 
Roger Reynolds (born July 18, 1934) is a Pulitzer prize-winning American composer.
Roxana Robinson (born 30 November 1946) is an American novelist and biographer whose fiction explores the complexity of familial bonds and fault lines.
David Rosenberg (poet) (born August 1, 1943 in Detroit, Michigan) is an American poet, biblical translator, editor, and educator. 
Norman Rosten (January 1, 1913 – March 7, 1995) was an American poet, playwright, and novelist.
Elizabeth S. Russell (May 1, 1913 – May 28, 2001), also known as "Tibby" Russell, was an American biologist in the field of mammalian developmental genetics
Stanley Schachter (April 15, 1922 – June 7, 1997) was an American social psychologist.
Betsy Schneider is an American photographer who lives and works in the Boston Area.
Edwin William Schultz (1888 Wisconsin – 1971) was an American pathologist.
Paul Schupp (born March 12, 1937) is a Professor Emeritus of Mathematics at the University of Illinois at Urbana Champaign. 
Kathryn Kish Sklar (born December 1939) is an American historian, author, and professor. 
Paul Slud (31 March 1918, New York City – 20 February 2006, Catlett, Virginia) was an American ornithologist and tropical ecologist, known for his 1960 monograph The Birds of Finca "La Selva," Costa Rica and his 1964 book The Birds of Costa Rica: Distribution and Ecology.
Joel Sobel (born 24 March 1954) is an American economist and currently professor of economics at the University of California, San Diego. 
Frank Spedding (22 October 1902 – 15 December 1984) was a Canadian American chemist. He was a renowned expert on rare earth elements, and on extraction of metals from minerals.
Edward A. Spiegel (1931 — January 2, 2020)[2] was an American professor of astronomy at Columbia University.
Duncan G. Steel (born 1951) is an American experimental physicist, researcher and professor in quantum optics in condensed matter physics. 
Alexander Stephan (August 16, 1946 – May 29, 2009) was a specialist in German literature and area studies. 
James W. Stigler is an American psychologist, researcher, entrepreneur and author.
Joan E. Strassmann is a North American evolutionary biologist and the Charles Rebstock Professor of Biology at the Washington University in St. Louis.
Larissa Szporluk is an American poet and professor. Her most recent book is Embryos & Idiots (Tupelo Press, 2007).
G. David Tilman (born 22 July 1949),[2] ForMemRS, is an American ecologist. 
Richard Toensing (March 11, 1940 - July 2, 2014) was an American composer and music educator.
David Treuer (born 1970) (Ojibwe) is an American writer, critic and academic. As of 2019, he had published seven books
Susan M. Ervin-Tripp (1927–2018) was an American linguist whose specialities were psycholinguistic and sociolinguistic research.
Karen Uhlenbeck (born August 24, 1942) is an American mathematician and a founder of modern geometric analysis.
Sim Van der Ryn is an American architect. He is also a researcher and educator
Henry Van Dyke (novelist), Jr. (1928 – December 22, 2011), was an American novelist, editor, teacher and musician.
Andrew G. Walder (born 1953) is an American political sociologist specializing in the study of Chinese society.
William Shi-Yuan Wang (Chinese: 王士元; born 1933) is a linguist, with expertise in phonology, the history of Chinese language and culture, historical linguistics, and the evolution of language in humans. 
Michael Watts (born 1951 in England) is Emeritus "Class of 1963" Professor of Geography and Development Studies at the University of California, Berkeley, USA.
Grady Webster (1927–2005) was a plant systematist and taxonomist. He was the recipient of a number of awards and appointed to fellowships of botanical institutions in the United States of America
Joan Weiner is an American philosopher and professor emerita of philosophy at Indiana University Bloomington,[1] known for her books on Gottlob Frege.
Morris Weitz (July 24, 1916 – February 1, 1981) "was an American philosopher of aesthetics who focused primarily on ontology, interpretation, and literary criticism".
Edmund White (born January 13, 1940) is an American novelist, memoirist, and an essayist on literary and social topics. 
Michael Stewart Witherell (born 22 September 1949) is an American physicist and laboratory director. He is currently the director of the Lawrence Berkeley National Laboratory.
Jorge Eduardo Wright (20 April 1922 – 2005) was an Argentinian mycologist.
X. J. Kennedy (born Joseph Charles Kennedy on August 21, 1929, in Dover, New Jersey) is an American poet, translator, anthologist, editor, and author of children's literature and textbooks on English literature and poetry. 
Al Young (May 31, 1939 – April 17, 2021) was an American poet, novelist, essayist, screenwriter, and professor.

Journalism, publishing, and broadcasting
Roz Abrams MA, news co-anchor for CBS; reporter and anchor for almost 30 years, including 18 years with WABC in New York
Sam Apple, publisher and editor-in-chief of The Faster Times
Dean Baker (Ph.D., Economics), blogger for The American Prospect
Ray Stannard Baker (MDNG LAW: 1891), biographer of Woodrow Wilson
Margaret Bourke-White (MDNG: 1922–1924), photographer and journalist
Rodney W. Brown, MA-education, MA-American culture, MA-English language and literature; producer of local and national television
Jon Chait (BA 1994), Senior Editor for The New Republic
Jeff Cohen, founder of Fairness and Accuracy in Reporting; left the group to produce Donahue on MSNBC
Sarah Costello, Co-Host/Editor of the asexual and aromantic podcast Sounds Fake But Okay.
Ann Coulter (LAW: JD 1988), conservative author and attorney
Rich Eisen (BA 1990), host of sportstalk TV/radio show, The Rich Eisen Show, and journalist for NFL Network and CBS Sports; former ESPN anchor
Larry Elder (LAW: JD 1977), talk radio show host, author, and TV show host
Win Elliot, sports announcer and journalist
John Fahey (BUS: MBA 1975), President and CEO of the National Geographic Society; former chairman, president and CEO of Time Life, Inc.; one of Advertising Ages top 100 marketers
Bill Flemming (BA), television sports journalist
Martin Ford (BSE 1985), author of Rise of the Robots: Technology and the Threat of a Jobless Future, winner of the 2015 Financial Times and McKinsey Business Book of the Year Award
James Russell Gaines (1973), former managing editor of Time Magazine
Arnold Gingrich (1925), founder and publisher of Esquire
Todd Gitlin (MA 1966, Political Science), professor of journalism; social critic
Wendell Goler, Fox News White House correspondent
George Zhibin Gu, journalist and consultant
Sanjay Gupta (MD: 1993), CNN anchor, reporter and senior medical correspondent; Emmy winner
Raelynn Hillhouse (HHRS: MA, Ph.D. 1993), national security expert and blogger (The Spy Who Billed Me); novelist; political scientist
Dana Jacobson (BA 1993), ESPN anchorwoman
Alireza Jafarzadeh, senior Foreign Affairs Analyst for Fox News Television and other major TV networks; author of The Iran Threat: President Ahmadinejad and the Coming Nuclear Crisis
Leon Jaroff (COE: BSE EE, BS EM 1950), a mainstay for the Time Inc. family of publications since he joined as an editorial trainee for LIFE magazine in 1951; moved to Time in 1954, and became its chief science writer in 1966; named a senior editor in 1970, a post he kept until he semi-retired in 2000
Paul Kangas, stockbroker for twelve years; host of Nightly Business Report since it was a local Florida program in 1979
Kayla Kaszyca, Co-Host/Marketing Manager of the asexual and aromantic podcast Sounds Fake But Okay.
Ken Kelley, founder of the Ann Arbor Argus and Sundance, and Playboy interviewer
William F. Kerby (AB 1920s), chairman of Dow Jones and Company
Laurence Kirshbaum (AB 1966), founder of LJK Literary Management; chairman of Time Warner Book Group
Melvin J. Lasky (MA History), combat historian in France and Germany during WWII; assistant to the U.S. Military Governor of Berlin in early postwar years; founder and editor of the anti-Communist journal Encounter, which was in 1966 shown to be secretly financed by the CIA
Daniel Levin, writer
Ann Marie Lipinski, former editor of the Chicago Tribune; 1987 Pulitzer Prize winner
Richard Lui (MBA), journalist; MSNBC news anchor; former news anchor for five years at CNN Worldwide
Wednesday Martin, journalist, memoirist, anthropologist
Robert McHenry, encyclopedist and author; editor-in-chief (emeritus) of the Encyclopædia Britannica
Ari Melber (AB 2002), MSNBC news anchor; NBC News legal analyst
John J. Miller, National Political Reporter for the National Review
Paul Scott Mowrer, journalist and Pulitzer Prize winner
Davi Napoleon (AB 1966; AM 1968), writes a monthly feature for Live Design; former columnist for TheaterWeek and InTheater
Daniel Okrent (BA 1969), public editor of New York Times; editor-at-large of Time Inc.; Pulitzer Prize finalist in history (Great Fortune, 2004); founding father of Rotisserie League Baseball
Marvin Olasky (Ph.D. 1976), conservative pundit
Susan Orlean (AB), staff writer for The New Yorker
Norman Ornstein, American Enterprise Institute Senior Fellow
Phil Ponce (LAW: JD 1974), Chicago television journalist, host of Chicago Tonight on WTTW PBS station
David Portnoy (1999, Education), founder of Barstool Sports
William E. Quinby (AB 1858, MA 1861), owner of the Detroit Free Press and United States Ambassador to the Netherlands
Evan Rosen (BA), journalist, strategist, author of The Culture of Collaboration
Adam Schefter, former Denver Post and Denver Broncos correspondent for 15 years; ESPN and NFL Network contributor
John Schubeck, television reporter and anchor, one of the few to anchor newscasts on all three network owned-and-operated stations in one major market
Samuel Spencer Scott, president of Harcourt, Brace & Company from 1948 until his retirement in 1954
David Shuster, television journalist with Current TV;talk radio host; former anchor for MSNBC; has also worked for Fox News and CNN
Rob Siegel (1993), editor-in-chief of The Onion; screenplay writer for The Wrestler
Carole Simpson (BA 1962), former ABC News correspondent;  Emerson College professor
Bert Randolph Sugar (LAW: JD 1961); former editor at The Ring, Boxing Illustrated, and Fight Game magazines; wrote more than 80 books on boxing, baseball, horse racing, and sports trivia
Amy Sullivan, contributing editor for Time magazine, covers religion and politics; also writes for the magazine's political blog, Swampland
Jerald F. ter Horst (also known as Jerald Franklin ter Horst) (BA 1947), Gerald Ford's short-term press secretary
Peter Turnley, photojournalist known for documenting the human condition and current events
John Voelker (LAW: 1928), author of Anatomy of a Murder
Mike Wallace (A.B. 1939), TV journalist, longtime host of 60 Minutes; winner of 20 Emmys and three Peabodys
David Weir, editor and journalist, editor in chief at Keep Media as of 2007
Margaret Wente (BA), writer for The Globe and Mail, 2006 winner of the National Newspaper Award for column-writing; has edited leading business magazines Canadian Business and ROB
David Westin (BA, with honors and distinction; LAW: JD summa cum laude 1977), president of ABC News
Roger Wilkins (AB 1953, LAW: LLB 1956, HLHD 1993), journalist of the Washington Post; shared the Pulitzer Prize for his Watergate editorials
Tracy Wolfson, reporter for CBS Sports
Bob Woodruff (LAW: JD), ABC World News Tonight anchor, replaced Peter Jennings
Robin Wright, author, Washington Post
Eric Zorn, columnist and blogger for the Chicago Tribune
Daniel Zwerdling, investigative radio journalist for NPR News
Svida Alisjahbana (BA 1988), CEO of Femina Indonesia, Indonesia’s leading women's magazine

Law, government, and public policy

MacArthur Foundation award winners
As of 2020, 31 Michigan alumni — 17 undergraduate students and 14 graduate students — have been awarded a MacArthur fellowship.

James Blinn (BS Physics 1970; MSE 1972; Communications Science 1970; MS Information and Control Engineering 1972)
Caroline Walker Bynum (BA 1962), Medieval scholar; MacArthur Fellow
Eric Charnov (BS 1969), evolutionary ecologist
 William A. Christian (Ph.D. 1971), religious studies scholar
Shannon Lee Dawdy (M.A. 2000, Ph.D. 2003), 2010 fellowship winner; assistant professor of anthropology at the University of Chicago
 Philip DeVries (B.S. 1975), biologist
 William H. Durham (Ph.D. 1973), anthropologist
Andrea Dutton (MA, Ph.D.) is an Associate Professor of Geology at the University of Florida
 Aaron Dworkin (BA 1997, M.A. 1998), Fellow, founder, and president of Detroit-based Sphinx Organization, which strives to increase the number of African-Americans and Latinos having careers in classical music
 Steven Goodman (BS 1984), adjunct research investigator in the U-M Museum of Zoology's bird division; conservation biologist in the Department of Zoology at Chicago's Field Museum of Natural History
 David Green (B.A. 1978; MPH 1982), executive director of Project Impact
Ann Ellis Hanson (BA 1957; MA 1963), visiting associate professor of Greek and Latin
 John Henry Holland (MA 1954; Ph.D. 1959), professor of electrical engineering and computer science, College of Engineering; professor of psychology, College of Literature, Science, and the Arts
June Huh (Ph.D.) a mathematician and a 2022 winner
Monica Kim (Ph.D.)  A University of Wisconsin-Madison historian and winner in 2022
Vonnie McLoyd (MA 1973, Ph.D. (1975), developmental psychologist
Natalia Molina (Professor) Molina received her Ph.D. and M.A. from the University of Michigan.
Denny Moore (BA), linguist, anthropologist
Nancy A. Moran (Ph.D. 1982), evolutionary biologist; Yale professor; co-founder of the Yale Microbial Diversity Institute
Dominique Morisseau (BFA 2000) is an American playwright and actor from Detroit, Michigan
 Cecilia Muñoz (BA 2000), senior vice president for the Office of Research, Advocacy and Legislation at the National Council of La Raza (NCLR), White House Director of Intergovernmental Affairs
Dimitri Nakassis (BA 1997), a 2015 MacArthur Fellow; joined the faculty of the University of Toronto in 2008; currently an associate professor in the Department of Classics
Richard Prum (Ph.D. 1989), William Robertson Coe Professor of Ornithology; Head Curator of Vertebrate Zoology at the Peabody Museum of Natural History at Yale University
Mary Tinetti (BA 1973; MD 1978), physician; Gladys Phillips Crofoot Professor of Medicine and Epidemiology and Public Health at Yale University; Director of the Yale Program on Aging
 Amos Tversky (Ph.D.. 1965), psychologist
 Karen K. Uhlenbeck (BA 1964), mathematician
Jesmyn Ward (MFA 2005), writer of fiction
Julia Wolfe (BA 1980), classical composer
Henry Tutwiler Wright (BA 1964), Albert Clanton Spaulding Distinguished University Professor of Anthropology in the Department of Anthropology; Curator of Near Eastern Archaeology in the Museum of Anthropology at the University of Michigan; 1993 MacArthur Fellows Program
Tara Zahra (MA 2002; Ph.D. 2005); fellow with the Harvard Society of Fellows (2005–2007) prior to joining the faculty of the University of Chicago; 2014 MacArthur Fellow
 George Zweig (BA 1959), physicist who conceptualized quarks ("aces" in his nomenclature)

Mathematics
Ralph H. Abraham, mathematician
Kenneth Ira Appel (Ph.D.), mathematician; in 1976, with colleague Wolfgang Haken at the University of Illinois at Urbana-Champaign, solved one of the most famous problems in mathematics, the four-color theorem
Edward G. Begle (MA 1936), mathematician known for his role as the director of the School Mathematics Study Group, the primary group credited for developing what came to be known as New Math
Harry C. Carver (BS 1915), mathematician and academic; a major influence in the development of mathematical statistics as an academic discipline
Brian Conrey (Ph.D. 1980), mathematician; executive director of the American Institute of Mathematics
George Dantzig (MA Math 1937), father of linear programming; studied at UM under T.H. Hildebrandt, R.L. Wilder, and G.Y. Rainich
Carl de Boor (Ph.D. Mathematics 1966), known for pioneering work on splines, National Medal of Science 2003; John von Neumann Prize from the Society for Industrial and Applied Mathematics in 1996
Dorothy Elizabeth Denning, information security researcher; author of four books and 140 articles; at Georgetown University, she was the Patricia and Patrick Callahan Family Professor of computer science and director of the Georgetown Institute of Information Assurance; professor in the Department of Defense Analysis at the Naval Postgraduate School
Sister Mary Celine Fasenmyer (Ph.D. 1946), mathematician noted for her work on hypergeometric functions and linear algebra; published two papers which expanded on her doctorate work and would be further elaborated by Doron Zeilberger and Herbert Wilf into "WZ theory", which allowed computerized proof of many combinatorial identities
Wade Ellis (Ph.D. 1948), mathematician and educator, Associate Dean of the Rockingham School of Graduate Mathematics, dean emeritus and professor emeritus
Walter Feit (Ph.D. 1955), winner of the 7th Cole Prize in 1965; known for proving the Feit–Thompson theorem
David Gale (MA 1947), mathematician and economist
Frederick Gehring (AB 1946), T. H. Hildebrandt Distinguished University Professor Emeritus of Mathematics; recipient of the 2006 AMS Leroy P. Steele Prize for Lifetime Achievement; taught at Michigan from 1955 until his retirement in 1996; invited three times to address the International Congress of Mathematicians; in 1989 elected to the National Academy of Sciences; in 1997, the Frederick and Lois Gehring Chair in Mathematics was endowed
Seymour Ginsburg (Ph.D. 1952), pioneer of automata theory, formal language theory, database theory, and computer science; his work was influential in distinguishing theoretical computer science from the disciplines of mathematics and electrical engineering
Thomas N.E. Greville (Ph.D. 1933), mathematician; specialized in statistical analysis as it concerned the experimental investigation of psi
Earle Raymond Hedrick (A.B. 1896), mathematician; vice-president of the University of California
Theophil Henry Hildebrandt, UM instructor of mathematics starting in 1909, where he spent most of his career; chairman of the department from 1934 until his retirement in 1957; received the second Chauvenet Prize of the Mathematical Association of America in 1929
June Huh (Ph.D. 2014), Fields Medal winner, mathematician at Princeton University.
Meyer Jerison (Ph.D. 1950), mathematician known for his work in functional analysis and rings, especially for collaborating with Leonard Gillman on one of the standard texts in the field, Rings of Continuous Functions
D.J. Lewis (Ph.D. 1950), mathematician specializing in number theory; chaired the Department of Mathematics at the University of Michigan (1984–1994); director of the Division of Mathematical Sciences at the National Science Foundation
James Raymond Munkres, professor emeritus of mathematics at MIT, author of classic textbook Topology
Ralph S. Phillips (Ph.D.), mathematician; academic; known for his contributions to functional analysis, scattering theory, and servomechanisms
Leonard Jimmie Savage (BS 1938, Ph.D. 1941), author of The Foundations of Statistics (1954); rediscovered Bachelier and introduced his theories to Paul Samuelson, who corrected Bachelier and used his thesis on randomness to advance derivative pricing theory
Joel Shapiro (Ph.D.), mathematician; leading expert in the field of composition operators
Isadore M. Singer (BA 1944), winner of the Abel Prize, the "Nobel of mathematics", and the Bôcher Memorial Prize
Stephen Smale (BS 1952, MS 1953, Ph.D. 1957), Fields Medal winner; winner of the 2007 Wolf Prize in mathematics;  1965 Veblen Prize for Geometry, awarded every five years by the American Mathematical Society; 1988 Chauvenet Prize from the Mathematical Association of America; 1989 Von Neumann Award from the Society for Industrial and Applied Mathematics
George W. Snedecor (MA 1913), mathematician and statistician
Edwin Henry Spanier (Ph.D. 1947), mathematician at the University of California at Berkeley, working in algebraic topology
Frank Spitzer (BA, Ph.D.), mathematician who made fundamental contributions to probability theory, including the theory of random walks, fluctuation theory, percolation theory, and especially the theory of interacting particle systems; his first academic appointments were at the California Institute of Technology (1953–1958); most of his academic career was spent at Cornell University, with leaves at the Institute for Advanced Study in Princeton and the Mittag-Leffler Institute in Sweden
Norman Steenrod (A.B. 1932), algebraic topologist, author of The Topology of Fiber Bundles; believed to have coined the phrase "abstract nonsense," used in category theory
Clarence F. Stephens (Ph.D.), ninth African American to receive a Ph.D. in mathematics; credited with inspiring students and faculty at SUNY Potsdam to form the most successful United States undergraduate mathematics degree programs in the past century
Robert Simpson Woodward (A.B. 1872); professor of mechanics, mathematical physics at Columbia (1899–1904); President of the American Mathematical Society (1899–1900); in 1904 became president of the newly formed Carnegie Institution
Cornelia Strong (M.A. 1931); professor of mathematics and astronomy at the Woman's College of the University of North Carolina
Ted Kaczynski (PH.D.), Youngest Professor at the University of California, Berkeley later arrested for domestic terrorism also known as the Unabomber.

Fellows of the American Mathematical Society
As of 2021, UM numbers amongst its alumni 29 Fellows of the American Mathematical Society.

Kenneth Appel (October 8, 1932 – April 19, 2013) was an American mathematician who in 1976, with colleague Wolfgang Haken at the University of Illinois at Urbana–Champaign, solved one of the most famous problems in mathematics, the four-color theorem.
Susanne Brenner is an American mathematician, whose research concerns the finite element method and related techniques for the numerical solution of differential equations.
Ralph Louis Cohen (born 1952) is an American mathematician, specializing in algebraic topology and differential topology.
Robert Connelly (born July 15, 1942) is a mathematician specializing in discrete geometry and rigidity theory. 
Brian Conrey (23 June 1955) is an American mathematician and the executive director of the American Institute of Mathematics. 
Ronald Getoor (9 February 1929, Royal Oak, Michigan – 28 October 2017, La Jolla, San Diego, California) was an American mathematician.
Tai-Ping Liu (Chinese: 劉太平; pinyin: Liú Tàipíng; born 18 November 1945) is a Taiwanese mathematician, specializing in partial differential equations.
Russell Lyons (6 September 1957) is an American mathematician, specializing in probability theory on graphs, combinatorics, statistical mechanics, ergodic theory and harmonic analysis.
Gaven Martin FRSNZ FASL FAMS (born 8 October 1958) is a New Zealand mathematician.
Susan Montgomery (born 2 April 1943 in Lansing, MI) is a distinguished American mathematician whose current research interests concern noncommutative algebras
Paul Muhly (born September 7, 1944) is an American mathematician.
James Munkres (born August 18, 1930) is a professor emeritus of mathematics at MIT
Zuhair Nashed (born May 14, 1936 in Aleppo, Syria) is an American mathematician, working on integral and operator equations, inverse and ill-posed problems, numerical and nonlinear functional analysis, optimization and approximation theory, operator theory, optimal control theory, signal analysis, and signal processing.
Peter Orlik (born 12 November 1938, in Budapest) is an American mathematician, known for his research on topology, algebra, and combinatorics.
Mihnea Popa (born 11 August 1973) is a Romanian-American mathematician at Harvard University, specializing in algebraic geometry. He is known for his work on complex birational geometry, Hodge theory, abelian varieties, and vector bundles.
Jane Cronin Scanlon (July 17, 1922 – June 19, 2018) was an American mathematician and an emeritus professor of mathematics at Rutgers University. 
Maria E. Schonbek is an Argentine-American mathematician at the University of California, Santa Cruz. Her research concerns fluid dynamics and associated partial differential equations such as the Navier–Stokes equations.
Paul Schupp (born March 12, 1937) is a Professor Emeritus of Mathematics at the University of Illinois at Urbana Champaign.
George Roger Sell (February 7, 1937 – May 29, 2015) was an American mathematician, specializing in differential equations, dynamical systems, and applications to fluid dynamics, climate modeling, control systems, and other subjects.
Charles Sims (mathematician) (April 14, 1937 – October 23, 2017) was an American mathematician best known for his work in group theory.
Isadore Singer (May 3, 1924 – February 11, 2021) was an American mathematician.
Christopher Skinner (born June 4, 1972) is an American mathematician working in number theory and arithmetic aspects of the Langlands program.
Karen E. Smith (born 1965 in Red Bank, New Jersey) is an American mathematician, specializing in commutative algebra and algebraic geometry.
Kannan Soundararajan (born December 27, 1973) is an India-born American mathematician and a professor of mathematics at Stanford University.
Irena Swanson is an American mathematician specializing in commutative algebra. 
Karen Uhlenbeck (born August 24, 1942) is an American mathematician and a founder of modern geometric analysis.
Judy L. Walker is an American mathematician. She is the Aaron Douglas Professor of Mathematics at the University of Nebraska–Lincoln, where she chaired the mathematics department from 2012 through 2016
John H. Walter (born 14 December 1927, Los Angeles) is an American mathematician known for proving the Walter theorem in the theory of finite groups.
Charles Weibel (born October 28, 1950 in Terre Haute, Indiana) is an American mathematician working on algebraic K-theory, algebraic geometry and homological algebra.

Mathematicians: African American
African American pioneers in the field of Mathematics

Joseph Battle, Year of Ph.D. 1963
Marjorie Lee Browne, Year of Ph. D. 1950, arguably the first African-American woman to earn a doctorate in mathematics
Wade Ellis, Year of Ph.D. 1944
Dorothy McFadden Hoover ABD, featured in Margot Lee Shetterly's bestselling book, Hidden Figures
Rogers Joseph Newman, Year of Ph.D. 1961
Joseph Alphonso Pierce, Year of Ph.D. 1938
Clarence F. Stephens, Year of Ph.D. 1944
Beauregard Stubblefield, Year of Ph.D. 1960
Irvin Elmer Vance, Year of Ph.D. 1967
Chelsea Walton, Year of Ph.D. 2011
Suzanne Weekes Year of Ph.D. 1995

Manhattan project
A number of Michigan graduates or fellows were involved with the Manhattan Project, chiefly with regard to the physical chemistry of the device.

Robert F. Bacher, Ph.D., member of the Manhattan Project; professor of physics at Caltech; president of the Universities Research Association
Lawrence Bartell before he had finished his studies he was invited by Glenn Seaborg to interview for a position working on the Manhattan Project. He accepted the job and worked on methods for extracting plutonium from uranium. 
Lyman James Briggs was an American engineer, physicist and administrator.
Donald L. Campbell was an American chemical engineer.
Allen F. Donovan worked for the Manhattan Project on the design of the shape of the Fat Man atomic bomb and its release mechanism.
Taylor Drysdale earned master's degrees in nuclear physics and mathematics from the University of Michigan, joined the U.S. military, worked on the Manhattan Project, and retired from the U.S. Air Force as a colonel.
Arnold B. Grobman Grobman began his post-secondary education at the University of Michigan in Ann Arbor, earning his bachelor's degree in 1939. From 1944 to 1946, he was a research associate on the Manhattan Project, later publishing "Our Atomic Heritage" about his experiences.
Herb Grosch received his B.S. and PhD in astronomy from the University of Michigan in 1942. In 1945, he was hired by IBM to do backup calculations for the Manhattan Project working at Watson Scientific Computing Laboratory at Columbia University.
Ross Gunn was an American physicist who worked on the Manhattan Project during World War II.
Isabella L. Karle, was x-ray crystallographer
Jerome Karle was an American physical chemist.
James Stark Koehler was an American physicist, specializing in metal defects and their interactions. He is known for the eponymous Peach-Koehler stress formula.
Emil John Konopinski (1933, MA 1934, Ph.D. 1936), patented a device that made the first hydrogen bomb with Dr. Edward Teller; member of the Manhattan Project
John Henry Manley was an American physicist who worked with J. Robert Oppenheimer at the University of California, Berkeley before becoming a group leader during the Manhattan Project.
Elliott Organick chemist, Manhattan Project, 1944-1945; 
Carolyn Parker was a physicist who worked from 1943 to 1947 on the Dayton Project, the plutonium research and development arm of the Manhattan Project.
Franklin E. Roach was involved in high explosives physics research connected with the Manhattan Project
Nathan Rosen was an American-Israeli physicist noted for his study on the structure of the hydrogen atom and his work with Albert Einstein and Boris Podolsky on entangled wave functions and the EPR paradox. 
Frank Spedding (1925), chemist; developed an ion exchange procedure for separating rare earth elements, purifying uranium, and separating isotopes; Guggenheim award winner
Arthur Widmer was attached on a three-year stint in 1943 as one of the Kodak researchers assigned to the Manhattan Project in Berkeley, California and Oak Ridge, Tennessee, as an analytical chemists developing methods of uranium analysis, which led to the development of the atomic bomb.

Medicine and dentistry
John Jacob Abel (PHARM: Ph.D. 1883), North American "father of pharmacology"; discovered epinephrine; first crystallized insulin; founded the department of pharmacology at Michigan; in 1893 established the department of pharmacology at the newly founded Johns Hopkins University School of Medicine; first full-time professor of pharmacology in the United States
Susan Anderson (1897), one of the first female physicians in Colorado
Robert C. Atkins (BA 1951), developed the Atkins Diet
John Auer (BS 1898), credited with the discovery of Auer rods
William Henry Beierwaltes (BS 1938, MED: MD 1941), champion of the use of radioiodine together with surgery in thyroid diagnosis and care; lead author of first book on nuclear medicine, 1957's Clinical Use of Radioisotopes
 Elissa P. Benedek (MD 1960), child and adolescent psychiatrist, forensic psychiatrist, adjunct clinical professor of psychiatry at the University of Michigan
David Botstein (Ph.D. 1967); leader in the Human Genome Project; director of Princeton's Lewis-Sigler Institute for Integrative Genomics
John Caffey (BA 1916, MD 1919), pediatric radiologist
Alexa Canady (AB 1971, MED: MD 1975), became first African-American female neurosurgeon in the country when she was 30; chief of neurosurgery at Children's Hospital of Michigan in Detroit for almost 15 years
Benjamin S. Carson (MED: MD 1977), former director of pediatric neurosurgery at Johns Hopkins Hospital
Arul Chinnaiyan (MED: MD 1999), cancer researcher; recipient of the 28th annual American Association for Cancer Research Award for Outstanding Achievement
Thomas Benton Cooley (MED: 1895), pediatrician; hematologist; professor of hygiene and medicine at the University of Michigan; son of Thomas McIntyre Cooley, first chairman of the Interstate Commerce Commission
Ronald M. Davis (AB 1978), 162nd president of the American Medical Association; Director of the Center for Health Promotion and Disease Prevention at the Henry Ford Health System in Detroit
Mary Gage Day (MED: MD 1888), physician, medical writer
Paul de Kruif (Ph.D. 1916), author of Microbe Hunters
Vine Cynthia Colby Foster (B.Phil. 1876), pioneering woman physician
Julio Frenk (SPH: M.P.H. 1981, MA 1982, Ph.D. 1983), Minister of Health for Mexico
Seraph Frissell (MED: MD 1875), physician, medical writer
Raymond Gist, president of the American Dental Association
Sanjay Gupta (MD: 1993), CNN anchor, reporter and senior medical correspondent; former neurosurgeon
Lucy M. Hall (MED: MD 1878), first woman ever received at St Thomas' Hospital's bedside clinics
Alice Hamilton (MED: MD 1893), specialist in lead poisoning and industrial diseases; known as the "Mother of Industrial Health;" in 1919 became the first woman on the faculty at Harvard Medical School; the first woman to receive tenure there; honored with her picture on the 55-cent postage stamp; winner of the Lasker Award
Nancy M. Hill (MED: MD 1874), Civil War nurse and one of the first female doctors in the US
Jerome P. Horwitz (Ph.D. 1950), synthesized AZT in 1964, a drug now used to treat AIDS
Joel Lamstein (BS 1965), co-founder and president of John Snow, Inc. (JSI) and JSI Research & Training Institute, Inc., international public health research and consulting firms
Josiah K. Lilly Jr. (1914 college of pharmacy), chairman and president of Eli Lilly
Howard Markel (MED: MD 1986), physician, medical historian, best-selling author, medical journalist, and member of the National Academy of Medicine, George E. Wantz Distinguished Professor of the History of Medicine at the University of Michigan, Guggenheim Fellow
William James Mayo (MED: MD 1883), co-founder of the Mayo Clinic
Jessica Rickert, first female American Indian dentist in America, which she became upon graduating from the University of Michigan School of Dentistry in 1975. She was a member of the Prairie Band Potawatomi Nation, and a direct descendant of the Indian chief Wahbememe (Whitepigeon).
Ida Rollins, first African-American woman to earn a dental degree in the United States, which she earned from the University of Michigan in 1890
Leonard Andrew Scheele (BA 1931), US Surgeon General 1948–1956
Eric B. Schoomaker (BS 1970, MED: MD 1975), Major General; Commander of the North Atlantic Regional Medical Command and Walter Reed Army Medical Center; former commanding general of the U.S. Army Medical Research and Materiel Command at Fort Detrick
Thomas L. Schwenk (MED: MD 1975), dean of the University of Nevada School of Medicine
John Clark Sheehan (MS 1938, Ph.D. 1941), chemist who pioneered the first synthetic penicillin breakthrough in 1957
Norman Shumway (MDNG), heart transplantation pioneer; entered the University of Michigan as a pre-law student, but was drafted into the Army in 1943
Parvinder Singh (PHARM: Ph.D. 1967), chairman of Ranbaxy in 1993 until his death in 1999; the market capitalization of the company went up from Rs.3.5 to over Rs. 7300 Crores during this period
Siti Hasmah Mohamad Ali (SPH 1966), one of the first female doctors in Malaysia, and later the wife of Malaysia's fourth Prime Minister Mahathir Mohamad
Dr. Homer Stryker (MED: MD 1925), founder of Stryker Corporation
Dr. William Erastus Upjohn (MED: MD 1875), inventor of the first pill that dissolved easily in the human body
Christine Iverson Bennett (MED: MD 1907), medical missionary who worked in Arabia during WWI
Larry Nassar (BS 1985), convicted serial child molester and a former USA Gymnastics national team doctor and osteopathic physician at Michigan State University
Richard C. Vinci, retired United States Navy admiral and former commander of the United States Navy Dental Corps

Military
George H. Cannon (BS 1938), United States Marine Corps officer and World War II Medal of Honor recipient killed during the First Bombardment of Midway. 
John P. Coursey (BS 1937), United States Marine Corps aviator during World War II and late Brigadier general
Francis C. Flaherty (BS 1940), United States Navy officer and World War II Medal of Honor recipient killed during the Attack on Pearl Harbor.
Edward C. Peter II (MS 1955), United States Army lieutenant general
Samuel C. Phillips (MS 1950), director of the Apollo program from 1964 to 1969, director of the National Security Agency from 1972 to 1973, commander of Air Force Systems Command from 1973 to 1975.
Oliver Lyman Spaulding, U.S. Army brigadier general
Charles Frederick Taylor (1858; did not graduate), Union Army colonel killed in action at the Battle of Gettysburg
Richard C. Vinci, retired United States Navy admiral and former commander of the United States Navy Dental Corps

Miscellaneous honors
Uwem Akpan (MFA 2007), Nigerian author; Jesuit priest; won Commonwealth Writers' Prize for Best First Book and the PEN/Beyond Margins Award for "Say You're One of Them"
W. Brian Arthur (MA 1969), Lagrange Prize in Complexity Science 2008; Schumpeter Prize in Economics 1990;
Amitava Bhattacharjee (M.A.) of the Princeton Plasma Physics Laboratory, Princeton University. Winner of 2022 James Clerk Maxwell Prize for Plasma Physics: "For seminal theoretical investigations of a wide range of fundamental plasma processes, including magnetic reconnection, magnetohydrodynamic turbulence, dynamo action, and dusty plasmas, and for pioneering contributions to linking laboratory plasmas to space and astrophysical plasmas."
Carl de Boor (Ph.D. Mathematics 1966), known for pioneering work o splines, National Medal of Science 2003; John von Neumann Prize from the Society for Industrial and Applied Mathematics in 1996
Arleigh Burke The Arleigh Burke class of guided-missile destroyers (DDGs) is a United States Navy class of destroyer built around the Aegis Combat System, an entire class of destroyers is named in his honor.
Robert Cailliau winner of an ACM award jointly awarded to Berners-Lee for the creation of the world wide web
Edgar Codd In 2004, SIGMOD renamed its highest prize to the SIGMOD Edgar F. Codd Innovations Award, in his honour.
Chuck Coleman won two Collier Trophies for his involvement in the development of the McDonnel Douglas C-17 Globemaster (1994) and Scaled Composites’ SpaceShipOne (2004). 
Natalie Zemon Davis (Ph.D. 1959) CC, Canadian and American historian of the early modern period; awarded the 2010 Holberg International Memorial Prize, 
David DeWitt ACM Fellow; He received the ACM SIGMOD Edgar F. Codd Innovations Award in 1995
Walter Feit (Ph.D. 1955), winner of the 7th Cole Prize in 1965; known for proving the Feit–Thompson theorem
Stephanie Forrest ACM/AAAI Allen Newell Award (2011)
Gerald Ford honored with navy ship CVN-78, the Gerald Ford, as well as an entire class of aircraft carriers named for him
Donald N. Frey (BS MTL 1947, MSE 1949, PhD 1951, D. Eng. hon. 1967), chairman and CEO of Bell & Howell for 17 years; received the National Medal of Technology in 1990
Frederick Gehring (AB 1946), T. H. Hildebrandt Distinguished University Professor Emeritus of Mathematics; recipient of the 2006 AMS Leroy P. Steele Prize for Lifetime Achievement
Aaron Hamburger (BA 1995), writer; his short story collection The View from Stalin's Head (2004) was awarded the Rome Prize by the American Academy of Arts and Letters and the American Academy in Rome; his novel Faith for Beginners (2005) was nominated for a Lambda Literary Award
Alice Hamilton pioneer in industrial health, honored with a 55 cent postage stamp in the Great Americans series; winner of the Lasker Award
Gabrielle Hamilton chef, author, winner of James Beard Award
Theophil Henry Hildebrandt, UM instructor of mathematics starting in 1909, where he spent most of his career; chairman of the department from 1934 until his retirement in 1957; received the second Chauvenet Prize of the Mathematical Association of America in 1929
Jessica Hollander (BA 2004), author of the Katherine Anne Porter Prize winning story collection In These Times the Home is a Tired Place (2013) and the chapbook Mythical Places (2019) Sonders Press
Tung-Hui Hu, Hu, a 1998 graduate in comparative literature, is an associate professor in English at the University of Michigan. He is the author of three books of poetry, “The Book of Motion,” “Mine” and “Greenhouses, Lighthouses,” as well as a study of digital culture, “A Prehistory of the Cloud.” He earned an MFA in creative writing at University of Michigan. He was awarded the Rome Prize in Literature for “Punishment, an Index.”
John D. Kraus IEEE Fellow; winner of a IEEE Centennial Medal winner of the IEEE Heinrich Hertz Medal
Ross Macdonald, namesake of the Ross Macdonald Literary Award
Charles Willard Moore (ARCH: B.Arch 1947, Hon Arch D. 1992), designer of Lurie Tower on Michigan's North Campus; winner of the AIA Gold Medal  in 1991
Patrick O'Keeffe (MFA), winner of the Hopwood Program's Chamberlain Award for Creative Writing for Above the Bar; instructor in U-M's Sweetland Writing Center; won the 2006 Story Prize for The Hill Road; won 2006 Whiting Writers Award
Larry Page, winner of the Marconi Prize in 2004
Claude Shannon IEEE Medal of Honor; National Medal of Science; Claude E. Shannon Award
Stephen Smale (BS 1952, MS 1953, Ph.D. 1957), Fields Medal winner; winner of the 2007 Wolf Prize in mathematics; 1965 Veblen Prize for Geometry; 1988 Chauvenet Prize from the Mathematical Association of America; 1989 Von Neumann Award from the Society for Industrial and Applied Mathematics 
Edmund White France made him Chevalier (and later Officier) de l'Ordre des Arts et des Lettres in 1993.
Nancy Willard (BA, PhD), 1982 Newbery Medal for A Visit to William Blake's Inn

NASA
Claudia Alexander (Ph.D.) moved to NASA's Jet Propulsion Laboratory in 1986. She was the last project manager of NASA's Galileo mission to Jupiter
Spence M. Armstrong (M.S.) is a retired United States Air Force general officer, combat veteran, and test pilot. Armstrong spent eleven years as a senior executive at the National Aeronautics and Space Administration (NASA).
Jim Blinn James F. Blinn is an American computer scientist who first became widely known for his work as a computer graphics expert at NASA's Jet Propulsion Laboratory (JPL),
 Scott J. Bolton (B.S.E.) has been a principal investigator with NASA on various research programs since 1988.  Bolton became the Principal Investigator of Juno, a New Frontiers program mission to Jupiter which began primary science in 2016.
Aisha Bowe (B.S.E. & M.S.E.) worked as an intern in the Ames Research Center in 2008, before joining as an Engineer. Bowe worked in the Ames Research Center, in the Flight Trajectory Dynamics and Controls Branch of the Aviation Systems Division.
Beth A. Brown (Ph.D.) was a NASA astrophysicist with a research focus on X-ray observations of elliptical galaxies and black holes. She earned a Ph.D. in Astronomy from the University of Michigan in 1998, becoming the first African-American woman to do so.
Steve Chappell is an American aerospace engineer. He is a Technical Lead & Research Specialist for Wyle Integrated Science & Engineering at NASA's Johnson Space Center (JSC) in Houston, Texas
Bob Dempsey (B.S.) is a NASA flight director for the International Space Station selected in 2005. As astronomer he worked at the Space Telescope Science Institute (STScI) prior to joining the ISS project.
Allen F. Donovan (M.S.) worked with NASA to solve the problem of combustion instability that affected Project Mercury, and later on the pogo oscillation problems that affected Project Gemini and Project Apollo.
Jeff Dozier (Ph.D.) worked as a senior member of the technical staff and the Project Scientist for a potential spectroscopy space mission at NASA's Jet Propulsion Laboratory. From 1990 to 1992 he worked at the NASA Goddard Space Flight Center as the Senior Project Scientist at the start of NASA's Earth Observing System
Julian Earls was made the director of the Glenn Research Center in 2003, where he was responsible for technology, research and development, and systems development. This role involved Earls managing a budget of over a billion dollars and a work force of 4,500
Dorothy McFadden Hoover (A.B.D.) was an American physicist and mathematician. Hoover was a pioneer in the early days of NASA. She was then hired at the National Advisory Committee for Aeronautics (NACA, later NASA) in Langley in 1943 as a professional (P-1) mathematician.
Usama Fayyad (Ph.D.) From 1989 to 1996 Fayyad held a leadership role at NASA's Jet Propulsion Laboratory (JPL), where his work in the analysis and exploration of Big Data in scientific applications (gathered from observatories, remote-sensing platforms and spacecraft) garnered him the top research excellence award that Caltech awards to JPL scientists – The Lew Allen Award for Excellence in Research, as well as a U.S. Government medal from NASA.
 Mei-Ching Hannah Fok (Ph.D.) is a Planetary Scientist at the Goddard Space Flight Center. She was awarded the NASA Exceptional Scientific Achievement Medal in 2011 and elected a Fellow of the American Geophysical Union in 2019. She has worked on the IMAGE, Van Allen Probes and TWINS missions.
Jack Garman (B.S.) was a computer engineer, former senior NASA executive and noted key figure of the Apollo 11 lunar landing.
William W. Hagerty (Ph.D.) From 1964 to 1970, Hagerty was an advisor to NASA and served as a board member to the National Science Foundation.
Martin Harwit (M.S.) designed, built and launched the first rocket-powered liquid-helium-cooled telescopes in the late 1960s and also carried out astronomical observations from high-altitude NASA aircraft. 
Richard C. Henry (M.S.) was a lieutenant general in the United States Air Force who served as commander of the Space Division, Air Force Systems Command, Los Angeles Air Force Station, Calif.
John T. Howe, (B.S.E.) During his 35 years with NASA, he served as senior staff scientist, head of aerothermodynamics, assistant chief for the physics branch, and branch chief for fluid dynamics.
Hyuck Kwon (Ph.D.) From 1989 to 1993, he was with the Lockheed Engineering and Sciences Company, Houston, Texas, as a principal engineer, working for NASA Space Shuttle and Space Station satellite communication systems.
Joel S. Levine (Ph.D.) In 1970, Langley Research Center associate director John Edward Duberg recruited Levine to work on the Viking program. Levine joined the Center in July 1970 and was assigned to the Aeronomy Section of the Planetary Physics Branch. He continued working for NASA until his retirement in 2011.
Bernard Lippmann (M.S.) in 1968 – 1969, he was a senior research associate at NASA's Goddard Institute for Space Studies. Much of his research during this time is classified.
James Fu Bin Lu is an American Internet entrepreneur. Lu received master's degrees in electrical engineering and computer science from the University of Michigan (graduating summa cum laude) and worked as an engineer for NASA's Jet Propulsion Laboratory, developing software for the Mars rover.
Harriet H. Malitson (M.S.) was an American astronomer. She was a solar researcher, employed at Goddard Space Flight Center and at the National Oceanic and Atmospheric Administration.
Stephen P. Maran (Ph.D.) was an astrophysicist at NASA's Goddard Space Flight Center for 35 years, from 1969-2004. During this time, he served as a staff scientist, project scientist, and principal investigator, and was involved in research on a number of missions, including the Hubble Space Telescope.
Hu Peiquan (Ph.D.) In 1944, Hu became a researcher at the Langley Research Center of the National Advisory Committee for Aeronautics (NACA, the predecessor of NASA). 
Samuel C. Phillips (M.S.) (February 19, 1921 – January 31, 1990) was a United States Air Force general who served as director of NASA's Apollo program from 1964 to 1969, the seventh director of the National Security Agency from 1972 to 1973, and as Commander, Air Force Systems Command from 1973 to 1975.
Phil Plait During the 1990s, Plait worked with the COBE satellite and later was part of the Hubble Space Telescope team at NASA Goddard Space Flight Center, working largely on the Space Telescope Imaging Spectrograph.
Margaret Hamilton (software engineer) Led a team credited with developing the software for Apollo and Skylab.
James Kasting (Ph.D.) is active in NASA's search for habitable extrasolar planets.
James Slattin Martin Jr. (B.S.) Martin joined NASA's Langley Research Center in September 1964 as assistant project manager for Lunar Orbiter. The five successful Lunar Orbiter missions provided significant new information about the Moon's surface and a wealth of photographic detail that stood as the definitive source of lunar surface information for years. In recognition of his contribution to this project, Martin was awarded the NASA Exceptional Service Medal in 1967.
Rob Meyerson (B.S.) began his career as an aerospace engineer at NASA Johnson Space Center (JSC) from 1985 to 1997 working [3] on human spaceflight systems, including the aerodynamic design of the Space Shuttle orbiter drag parachute. He is the former president of Blue Origin.
Elisa Quintana(Ph.D.) was a member of the NASA Kepler Mission Team at NASA Ames Research Center from 2006 to 2017. She worked as a scientific programmer developing the Kepler pipeline, for which she was awarded the NASA Software of the Year in 2010.
Judith Racusin (B.S.) is an American astrophysicist. She works at Goddard Space Flight Center as a research aerospace technologist in fields and particles.
Louis W. Roberts (M.S.) was an American microwave physicist. He was chief of the Microwave Laboratory at NASA's Electronics Research Center in the 1960s.
William H. Robbins (B.S.) was an American engineer who worked for the National Aeronautics and Space Administration (NASA). During his long career at NASA, he worked on the NERVA nuclear rocket engine, NASA wind turbines, communication satellites, and the Shuttle-Centaur program. 
James Russell III (Ph.D.) is an atmospheric scientist who has served as the developer of instrumentation for several NASA probes. 
Kamal Sarabandi (Ph.D.) is a member of Science Team for NASA Soil Moisture Active and Passive (SMAP).
Joseph Francis Shea was an American aerospace engineer and NASA manager. 
 Roy Spencer (scientist)  is a meteorologist, a principal research scientist at the University of Alabama in Huntsville, and the U.S. Science Team leader for the Advanced Microwave Scanning Radiometer (AMSR-E) on NASA's Aqua satellite.
Vaino Jack Vehko (B.S.) In 1960 Vehko became director of engineering on the Saturn S-I and S-IB booster rocket program. The Saturn IB boosters successfully launched four uncrewed and five crewed Apollo missions. They were the forerunners of the Saturn V that launched the NASA Apollo moon missions. 
Kevin J. Zahnle (Ph.D.) is a planetary scientist at the NASA Ames Research Center and a Fellow of the American Geophysical Union. He studies impact processes, atmospheric escape processes, geochemical modelling of atmophiles, and photochemical modelling.
Noel Zamot (M.S.) was selected as a member of the NASA Astronaut Training Group 16 and became a semi finalist NASA astronaut candidate.

National Academy Members
As of 2021, dozens of Michigan graduates have been inducted into various National Academies (inter alia, The National Academy of Engineering, The National Academy of Science...)

John Jacob Abel was an American biochemist and pharmacologist. He established the pharmacology department at Johns Hopkins University School of Medicine in 1893
Edward Charles Bassett (1921–1999)[1] was an American architect based in San Francisco.  He was elected into the National Academy of Design as an associate member in 1970, and became a full member in 1990.
Michael Bellavia He was the COO of Animax Entertainment, an animation, game, and interactive content production company. While at Animax, in 2006, Bellavia won one of the first broadband Emmy Awards for a series of animated shorts that were produced for ESPN.
John Robert Beyster often styled J. Robert Beyster, was the founder of Science Applications International Corporation.
Lyman James Briggs in 1932, Briggs was nominated by US President Herbert C. Hoover to Burgess as director of the National Bureau of Standards.
James Brown (ecologist)  is an American biologist and academic.
John W. Cahn (January 9, 1928 – March 14, 2016) was an American scientist and recipient of the 1998 National Medal of Science. 
Robert L. Carneiro was an American anthropologist and curator of the American Museum of Natural History. 
Rufus Cole was an American medical doctor and the first director of the Rockefeller University Hospital.
George Comstock (astronomer) He helped organize the American Astronomical Society in 1897, serving first as secretary and later as vice president. He was elected to the National Academy of Sciences in 1899.
Heber Doust Curtis From 1902 to 1920 Curtis worked at Lick Observatory, continuing the survey of nebulae initiated by Keeler.
David DeWitt He was elected a member of the National Academy of Engineering (1998) for the theory and construction of database systems. He is also a Fellow of the Association for Computing Machinery.
Allen F. Donovan was an American aerospace engineer and systems engineer who was involved in the development of the Atlas and Titan rocket families.
James R. Downing is an American pediatric oncologist and executive. He is the president and chief executive officer of St. Jude Children's Research Hospital.
Harry George Drickamer (November 19, 1918 – May 6, 2002), born Harold George Weidenthal, was a pioneer experimentalist in high-pressure studies of condensed matter.
John M. Eargle was an Oscar- and Grammy-winning audio engineer and a musician (piano and church and theater organ).
Kent Flannery is a North American archaeologist who has conducted and published extensive research on the pre-Columbian cultures and civilizations of Mesoamerica, and in particular those of central and southern Mexico.
Mars Guy Fontana His contribution at the university was such that in the List of buildings at Ohio State University he has a building named after him - The Fontana Laboratories. He also has a professorship named after him.
Donald S. Fredrickson was an American medical researcher, principally of the lipid and cholesterol metabolism, and director of National Institutes of Health and subsequently the Howard Hughes Medical Institute.
Robert A. Fuhrman was an American engineer responsible for the development of the Polaris Missile and Poseidon missile, as well as president and chief operating officer of Lockheed Corporation. Fuhrman was elected to the National Academy of Engineering in 1976 "for contributions to the design and development of the Polaris and Poseidon underwater launch ballistic missile systems".
Stanley Marion Garn was a human biologist and educator. He was professor of anthropology at the College for Literature, Science and Arts at the University of Michigan.
Sam Granick was an American biochemist known for his studies of ferritin and iron metabolism more broadly, of chloroplast structure, and of the biosynthesis of heme and related molecules.
Sonia Guillén Guillén is one of Peru's leading experts in mummies.
George Edward Holbrook was a noted American chemical engineer and a founding member of the National Academy of Engineering.
George W. Housner was a professor of earthquake engineering at the California Institute of Technology and National Medal of Science laureate.
George Huebner Chrysler reorganized their research department in 1946 and Huebner was made chief engineer.
Bill Ivey is an American folklorist and author. He was the seventh chairman of the National Endowment for the Arts, and is a past chairman of the National Academy of Recording Arts and Sciences.
Kelly Johnson (engineer) He is recognized for his contributions to a series of important aircraft designs, most notably the Lockheed U-2 and SR-71 Blackbird.
Lewis Ralph Jones was an American botanist and agricultural biologist.
Paul Kangas was the Miami-based co-anchor of the PBS television program Nightly Business Report, a role he held from 1979, when the show was a local PBS program in Miami, through December 31, 2009.
Paul J. Kern served as Commanding General of the United States Army Materiel Command from October 2001 to November 2004.
Pete King (composer) He was elected president of the National Academy of Recording Arts and Sciences in 1967.
Conrad Phillip Kottak is an American anthropologist. He did extensive research in Brazil and Madagascar, visiting societies there and writing books about them.
Thomas A. LaVeist (MA 1985, PhD 1988, PDF 1990), Dean and Weatherhead Presidential Chair in Health Equity at Tulane University School of Public Health & Tropical Medicine
Alexander Leaf was a physician and research scientist best known for his work linking diet and exercise to the prevention of heart disease.
Samuel C. Lind was a radiation chemist, referred to as "the father of modern radiation chemistry".
Joyce Marcus is a Latin American archaeologist and professor in the Department of Anthropology, College of Literature, Science, and the Arts at the University of Michigan, Ann Arbor. She also holds the position of Curator of Latin American Archaeology, University of Michigan Museum of Anthropological Archaeology.
Bill Joy William Nelson Joy (born November 8, 1954) co-founded Sun Microsystems in 1982 served as chief scientist and CTO at the company until 2003.
Isabella Karle was an American chemist who was instrumental in developing techniques to extract plutonium chloride from a mixture containing plutonium oxide.
James Nobel Landis He is known as a founding member of the National Academy of Engineering,[1] and as president of the American Society of Mechanical Engineers in the year 1958-59.
Warren Harmon Lewis He served as president of the American Association of Anatomists and the International Society for Experimental Cytology, and held honorary memberships in the Royal Microscopical Society in London and Accademia Nazionale dei Lincei in Rome.
Anne Harris (musician) She has served an elected term on the Board of Governors of the Chicago Chapter of the National Academy of Recording Arts and Sciences.
Herbert Spencer Jennings was an American zoologist, geneticist, and eugenicist.
Digby McLaren he was the head of the palaeontology section of the GSC (the Geological Survey of Canada (GSC))
Marshall Warren Nirenberg was an American biochemist and geneticist.[2] He shared a Nobel Prize in Physiology or Medicine in 1968
Kenneth Olden He was director of the National Institute of Environmental Health Sciences (NIEHS) and National Toxicology Program, being the first African-American to head an NIH institute, a position he held from 1991 to 2005.
Raymond Pearl was an American biologist, regarded as one of the founders of biogerontology.
Samuel C. Phillips was a United States Air Force general who served as director of NASA's Apollo program from 1964 to 1969, the seventh director of the NSA from 1972 to 1973, and as commander of Air Force Systems Command from 1973 to 1975.
John Porter (Illinois politician)  During his chairmanship in the NIH he led efforts resulting in doubling funding for the NIH.
Bonnie Rideout is a member of the National Academy of Recording Arts and Sciences (NARAS), having served on the Board of Governors for the Washington D.C. branch.
Eugene Roberts (neuroscientist)  was an American neuroscientist. In 1950, he was the first to report on the discovery of gamma-Aminobutyric acid (GABA) in the brain, and his work was key in demonstrating GABA as the main inhibitory neurotransmitter in the mammalian central nervous system.
Elizabeth S. Russell was an American biologist in the field of mammalian developmental genetics
Shirley E. Schwartz was inducted into the Michigan Women's Hall of Fame in 1996 for her accomplishments in the field of chemistry.
Frank Spitzer was an Austrian-born American mathematician who made fundamental contributions to probability theory, including the theory of random walks, fluctuation theory, percolation theory, the Wiener sausage, and especially the theory of interacting particle systems.
Michael Stryker an American neuroscientist specializing in studies of how spontaneous neural activity organizes connections in the developing mammalian brain
Kapila Vatsyayan was a leading scholar of Indian classical dance, art, architecture, and art history. She served as a member of parliament and as a bureaucrat in India, and also served as the founding director of the Indira Gandhi National Centre for the Arts.
Mary Jane West-Eberhard is an American theoretical biologist noted for arguing that phenotypic and developmental plasticity played a key role in shaping animal evolution and speciation.
Eugene C. Whitney was a celebrated power engineer who designed hydroelectric turbines and generators at Westinghouse Electric Company. The pinnacle of his career was the machinery for the expansion of the Grand Coulee Dam to add the #3 Powerhouse in 1966–74.
Henry T. Wright He serves as the Albert Clanton Spaulding Distinguished University Professor of Anthropology in the Department of Anthropology, and Curator of Near Eastern Archaeology in the Museum of Anthropology at the University of Michigan.
Robert Wurtz is an American neuroscientist working as a NIH Distinguished Scientist and chief of the section on visuomotor integration at the National Eye Institute.
James Wyngaarden served as director of National Institutes of Health between 1982 and 1989.
Melinda A. Zeder is an American archaeologist and curator emeritus in the Department of Anthropology of the National Museum of Natural History, Smithsonian Institution.
George Zweig is a Russian-American physicist. He was trained as a particle physicist under Richard Feynman. He introduced, independently of Murray Gell-Mann, the quark model (although he named the constituent components "aces").

Newsmakers
Bill Ayers (BA 1968), co-founder of the radical Weathermen
Benjamin Bolger (BA 1994), holds what is said to be the largest number of graduate degrees held by a living person
Mamah Borthwick (BA 1892), mistress of architect Frank Lloyd Wright who was murdered at his studio, Taliesin
Napoleon Chagnon (Ph.D.), anthropologist, professor of anthropology
Rima Fakih (BA), 2010 Miss USA
Geoffrey Fieger (BA, MA), attorney based in Southfield, Michigan
Robert Groves (Ph.D. 1975), 2009 Presidential nominee to head the national census; nomination stalled by Republican opposition to use of "sampling" methodology, which Groves had already stated would not be used
Janet Guthrie (COE: BSc Physics 1960), inducted into the International Motorsports Hall of Fame in 2006; first woman to race in the Indianapolis 500; still is the only woman to ever lead a Nextel Cup race; top rookie in five different races in 1977 including the Daytona 500 and at Talladega; author of autobiography  Janet Guthrie: A Life at Full Throttle
Alireza Jafarzadeh, whistle-blower of Iran's alleged nuclear weapons program when he exposed in August 2002 the nuclear sites in Natanz and Arak, and triggered the inspection of the Iranian nuclear sites by the UN for the first time; author of The Iran Threat: President Ahmadinejad and the Coming Nuclear Crisis
Carol Jantsch (BFA 2006), the sole female tuba player on staff with a major U.S. orchestra, believed to be the first in history; at 21, the youngest member of the Philadelphia Orchestra
Morris Ketchum Jessup (MS Astronomy), author of ufological writings; played role in "uncovering" the so-called "Philadelphia Experiment"
Adolph Mongo (BGS 1976), political consultant
Jerry Newport (BA Mathematics), author with Asperger syndrome whose life was the basis for the 2005 feature-length movie Mozart and the Whale; named "Most Versatile Calculator" in the 2010 World Calculation Cup
Jane Scott, rock critic for The Plain Dealer in Cleveland, Ohio; covered every major local rock concert; until her retirement in 2002 she was known as "The World's Oldest Rock Critic;" influential in bringing the Rock and Roll Hall of Fame to Cleveland
Michael Sekora (BS 1977), founder and director of Project Socrates, the intelligence community's classified program that was tasked with determining the cause of America's economic decline
Robert Shiller (BA 1967), economist; author of Irrational Exuberance
Jerome Singleton (COE: IEOR), Paralympic athlete, competing mainly in category T44 (single below knee amputation) sprint events
Jerald F. ter Horst (BA 1947), briefly President Ford's press secretary

Not-for-profit
Larry Brilliant (SPH: MPH 1977, Economic Development and Health Planning), head of Google Foundation (holds assets of $1Bn); co-founder of the Well; in 1979 he founded the Seva Foundation, which has given away more than $100 million; CEO of SoftNet Systems Inc., a global broadband Internet services company in San Francisco that at its peak had more than 500 employees and $600 million capitalization
Mark Malloch Brown (MA), Chef de Cabinet, no.2 rank in the United Nations system; Deputy Secretary-General
John Melville Burgess (BA 1930, MA 1931, Hon DHum 1963), diocesan bishop of Massachusetts and the first African American to head an Episcopal diocese
 Edgar Fiedler (1929–2003), economist
Stephen Goldsmith (LAW: JD), Marion County district attorney for 12 years; two-term mayor of Indianapolis (1992–1999); appointed senior fellow at the Milken Institute (economic think tank) in 2006; his work in Indianapolis has been cited as a national model
Lisa Hamilton (LAW: JD), named in 2007 president of the UPS Foundation; previously its program director
Bill Ivey (BA 1966), chairman of the National Endowment for the Arts 1998–2001, credited with restoring the agency's credibility with Congress; appointed by President Clinton
Bob King (BA 1968), President of the UAW
Michael D. Knox (MSW 1971, MA 1973, PhD psychology 1974), chair and CEO of the US Peace Memorial Foundation and distinguished professor, University of South Florida
Rajiv Shah (AB), former director of agricultural development for the Bill & Melinda Gates Foundation, nominated in 2009 as chief scientist at the United States Department of Agriculture and undersecretary of agriculture for research, education and economics; Administrator for the United States Agency for International Development
Jack Vaughn, United States Peace Corps Director
John George Vlazny (MA 1967), Roman Catholic prelate; Metropolitan Archbishop of the Roman Catholic Archdiocese of Portland
Mark Weisbrot (Ph.D., economics), economist and co-director of the Center for Economic and Policy Research in Washington, D.C.; co-author, with Dean Baker, of Social Security: The Phony Crisis

Pulitzer Prize winners
As of 2022, 35 of Michigan's matriculants have been awarded a Pulitzer Prize. By alumni count, Michigan ranks fifth (as of 2018) among all schools whose alumni have won Pulitzers.
Natalie Angier (MDNG), Pulitzer Prize for Beat Reporting studied for two years at Michigan; nonfiction writer; science journalist for The New York Times; won 1991 
Ray Stannard Baker (LAW: attended 1891); Pulitzer Prize for Biography or Autobiography published 15 volumes about Wilson and internationalism, including an 8-volume biography, the last two volumes of which won the 1940 Pulitzer Prize
Leslie Bassett, (1956: DMA) won the 1966 Pulitzer Prize for Music, for Variations for Orchestra, premiered in Rome in 1963 by the RAI Symphony Orchestra under Feruccio Scaglia
Howard W. Blakeslee, (A.B. 1935) won the Pulitzer Prize for Reporting in 1937. The Associated Press's first full-time science reporter
Edwin G. Burrows (BA 1964), won the 1999 Pulitzer Prize for History for the Gotham: A History of New York City to 1898
George Crumb (MUSIC: PhD 1959), composer and 1968 Pulitzer Prize for Music
Sheri Fink (BS 1990), 2010 Pulitzer Prize for Investigative Reporting for The Deadly Choices at Memorial
Robin Givhan (MA journalism), 2006 Pulitzer Prize for Criticism
Amy Harmon (BA), 2008 Pulitzer Prize for Explanatory Reporting for a series titled "The DNA Age"
Stephen Henderson (B.A. 1992), former editorial page editor for The Michigan Daily, won Pulitzer Prize for Commentary in 2014; as Editorial Page Editor of the Detroit Free Press, he was honored for his reports on the bankruptcy of Detroit
Azmat Khan (B.A. 2007) winner of 2022 Pulitzer Prize in International Reporting
Charlie LeDuff (BA), one of several reporters who worked on the New York Times series "How Race is Lived in America," which won a Pulitzer Prize for National Reporting in 2001
David Levering Lewis (MDNG), historian; two-time winner of the Pulitzer Prize for Biography or Autobiography
Leonard Levy, (BA) Levy obtained his undergraduate degree from the University of Michigan and his Ph.D. from Columbia University. He won a Pulitzer Prize for History in 1969 for his Origins of the Fifth Amendment in 1969.
Stanford Lipsey (AB 1948), publisher of The Sun Newspaper Group and The Buffalo News; Pulitzer Prize for Investigative Journalism 1972
Ann Marie Lipinski (1994), former editor of the Chicago Tribune; 1987 Pulitzer Prize for Local Reporting winner
Joseph Livingston (A.B. 1925) was a business journalist and economist known for his long-running syndicated economics column for which he received a 1965 Pulitzer Prize for International Reporting 
Andrew C. McLaughlin (BA JD); author of A Constitutional History of the United States, winner of 1936 Pulitzer Prize for History
William McPherson (MDNG 1951–1955), Pulitzer Prize for Distinguished Criticism in 1977
Arthur Miller (AB 1938), playwright; Pulitzer Prize for Drama and Tony Award-winning author
Howard Moss (1939–1940), won the Pulitzer Prize for Poetry for Selected Poems in 1971
Edgar Ansel Mowrer (AB 1913), winner of the 1933 Pulitzer Prize for Correspondence; journalist and author known for his writings on international events
Paul Scott Mowrer (1906-1908, Honorary Doctor of Letters 1941), journalist; Pulitzer Prize for Correspondence winner in 1929
Lisa Pollak (B.A. 1990) is an American journalist. She won the 1997 Pulitzer Prize for Feature Writing.
Roger Reynolds (COE: BSE), composer; his 25-minute-long piece for string orchestra, Whispers out of Time, won the 1989 Pulitzer Prize for Music
Eugene Robinson, Michigan Daily Co-Editor-in-Chief in 1973–74; awarded a Pulitzer Prize for Commentary in April 2009 for his Washington Post commentaries on the 2008 presidential campaign
Theodore Roethke (AB 1929, MA), poet; winner of the 1954 Pulitzer Prize for Poetry for his collection The Waking
Heather Ann Thompson (BA, MA), Pulitzer Prize for History; historian, author, activist, and speaker
David C. Turnley (BA 1977), photographer, winner of the Pulitzer Prize for Feature Photography
Claude H. Van Tyne (BA 1896), 1930 Pulitzer Prize for History for his book The War of Independence
Michael Vitez, (journalism fellow) winner of Pulitzer Prize in Explanatory Journalism; journalist,  author
Josh White, journalist; worked with a team covering the Virginia Tech shooting massacre, which won the 2008 Pulitzer Prize
Roger Wilkins (AB 1953, LAW: LLB 1956, HLHD 1993), journalist of the Washington Post; shared the Pulitzer Prize for his Watergate editorials
Julia Wolfe (BA), composer; winner of a 2015 Pulitzer Prize for Music
Taro Yamasaki (MDNG), winner of the Pulitzer Prize for Feature Photography

Michigan alumnus Jeffrey Seller has produced two Pulitzer Prize winning plays on Broadway:
Jeffrey Seller was the producer for:
 Rent, featuring music, lyrics, and book by Jonathan Larson, which won the Pulitzer Prize for Drama in 1996. 
Seller also produced Hamilton which won the Pulitzer Prize for Drama in 2016.

Rhodes Scholars

As of 2021, Michigan has matriculated 30 Rhodes Scholars. Some notable winners are linked below.

James K. Watkins, 1911
Brand Blanshard, 1913
Albert C. Jacobs, 1921
Bertrand Harris Bronson, 1922
Allan Seager, 1930
Samuel Beer, 1932
Wilfred Sellars, 1934
R. V. Roosa, 1939
Abdul El-Sayed, 2009

Science
Isabella Abbott (MS 1942), ethnobotanist, specialized in algae; more than 200 algae owe their discovery and scientific names to her
Werner Emmanuel Bachmann (Ph.D. 1926), chemist; pioneer in steroid synthesis; carried out the first total synthesis of a steroidal hormone, equilenin; winner of a Guggenheim award
Frank Benford (1910), an electrical engineer and physicist known for Benford’s Law, also devised in 1937 an instrument for measuring the refraction index of glass
John Joseph Bittner (Ph.D. 1930), geneticist and cancer biologist, made contributions on the genetics of breast cancer
John M. Carpenter (M.S. 1958, Ph.D. 1963), nuclear engineer, Fellow of the American Association for the Advancement of Science
Rajeshwari Chatterjee (Ph.D. 1953), pioneer in Indian microwave engineering
Christine L. Clouser (M.S., Ph.D.), American virologist 
Carol McDonald Connor (Ph.D. 2002), Educational Psychologist with contributions to early literacy and reading comprehension research
Bernhard Dawson (B.S., Ph.D. 1933), U.S.-born Argentinian astronomer; namesake of Dawson crater
David Mathias Dennison, physicist who made contributions to quantum mechanics, spectroscopy, and the physics of molecular structure; Guggenheim award winner
Gerald R. Dickens (Ph.D. 1996), Professor of Earth Science at Rice University
Charles Fremont Dight (MED 1879), medical professor; promoter of the human eugenics movement in Minnesota
William Gould Dow (COE: MSE 1929), pioneer in electrical engineering, space research, and nuclear engineering; former chairman of EECS Department
Douglas J. Futuyma (Ph.D.), author of the widely used textbook Evolutionary Biology, and Science on Trial: The Case for Evolution, an introduction to the creation–evolution controversy; President of the Society for the Study of Evolution; President of the American Society of Naturalists; editor of Evolution and the Annual Review of Ecology and Systematics; received Sewall Wright Award from the American Society of Naturalists; Guggenheim Fellow; Fulbright Fellow; member of National Academy of Sciences
Frank Gill (BS, PhD 1969), ornithologist; author of the standard textbook Ornithology; editor of the encyclopedic series Birds of North America; former president of the American Ornithologists' Union
Moses Gomberg (PhD 1894), U-M professor of chemistry; discovered organic free radicals in 1900
Pilar González i Duarte (MS), chemist; president, Catalan Society of Chemistry
Billi Gordon, PhD (BGS 1997), works in functional neuroimaging and brain research at the David Geffen School of Medicine at UCLA; investigates the pathophysiology of stress as antecedent to obesity-related diseases at the UCLA Gail and Gerald Oppenheimer Family Center for the Neurobiology of Stress; included on list of "30 Most Influential Neuroscientists Alive Today"
Arnold B. Grobman (B.A.), zoologist
Martin Harwit (MS), studied under Fred Hoyle; designed the first liquid-helium-cooled rockets for boosting telescopes into the atmosphere; investigated airborne infrared astronomy and infrared spectroscopy for NASA; Bruce Medal 2007; National Air and Space Museum Director 1987–95
Clara H. Hasse (Ph B 1903), botanist
Duff Holbrook (M.S.), wildlife biologist and forester, reintroduced wild turkeys to much of South Carolina
Jerome Horwitz (Ph.D.), developed AZT, an antiviral compound used in the treatment of AIDS
Edward Israel (AB 1881), astronomer and Arctic explorer
Diane Larsen-Freeman (Ph.D), linguist
Zachary J. Lemnios (COE: BSEE), Director of Defense Research and Engineering; former chief technology officer at MIT Lincoln Laboratory
Armin O. Leuschner (BS Math 1888), astronomer at Berkeley, first graduate student at Lick Observatory; devised a simplification of differential corrections; improved the methodology for determining the courses of planetoids and comets; oversaw a survey of all the known minor planets; founded the Astronomy Department at Berkeley and served as director of its student observatory for 40 years, which was renamed in his honor days after his death; James Craig Watson Medal 1916; Bruce Medal 1936; American Astronomical Society; namesake of Asteroid 1361 Leuschneria
Yuei-An Liou, distinguished professor and director at the Center for Space and Remote Sensing Research, National Central University, Taiwan
Jane Claire Marks – conservation ecologist and educator, Professor of Aquatic Ecology at Northern Arizona University,  lead scientist in the PBS documentary, A River Reborn: The Restoration of Fossil Cree
J. Ward Moody (Ph.D. 1986), professor of astronomy at Brigham Young University (BYU), principal author of the textbook Physical Science Foundations, work on Large-scale structure of the universe.
Homer A. Neal (PhD 1966), director of the ATLAS Project; board member, Ford Motors (1997–); Smithsonian Institution Board of Regents
Harald Herborg Nielsen (Ph.D.), physicist who performed pioneering research in molecular infrared spectra
Antonia Novello (MED: 1974), first female US Surgeon General
James Arthur Oliver (MSC 1937; Ph.D. 1942), herpetologist; director of the Bronx Zoo, the American Museum of Natural History and the New York Aquarium; the only person ever to have held the directorship at all three institutions
Donald Othmer (MSC 1925; Ph.D. 1927), co-founded and co-edited the 27-volume Kirk—Othmer Encyclopedia of Chemical Technology in 1947; chairman of Polytechnic University Chemical Engineering Department (1937–1961); invented the Othmer still, which concentrated the acetic acid needed to produce cellulose acetate for motion picture film; awarded 40 patents at Kodak
Raymond Pearl (Ph.D. 1902),  one of the founders of biogerontology
Henry Pollack (Ph.D. 1963), emeritus professor of geophysics at the University of Michigan
Albert Benjamin Prescott (MED: 1864), chemist; dean of the school of pharmacy in 1876; director of the chemical laboratory in 1884; president of the American Chemical Society in 1886; president of the American Association for the Advancement of Science in 1891; president of the American Pharmaceutical Association in 1900
Edwin William Schultz (A.B. 1914), pathologist; Guggenheim award winner
Shirley E. Schwartz (BS 1957), chemist and research scientist at General Motors
Homi Sethna (M.A. 1946), former chairman of Atomic Energy Commission of India; in 1976 became the first chairman of Maharashtra Academy of Sciences in Pune, Maharashtra
Joseph Beal Steere (A.B. 1868), ornithologist
Marie Tharp (MS Geology), oceanographic cartographer whose work paved the way for the theories of plate tectonics and continental drift
Catherine Troisi (Ph.D. 1980), epidemiologist
Juris Upatnieks (MSE EE 1965), with Emmett Leith created the first working hologram in 1962
Steven G. Vandenberg (Ph.D. 1955), behavior geneticist
James McDonald Vicary, market researcher; pioneered the notion of subliminal advertising in 1957
James Craig Watson (BA 1857, MA 1859), astronomer, established the James Craig Watson Medal
John V. Wehausen (BS 1934, MS 1935, Ph.D. 1938), researcher in hydrodynamics
Nancy Wexler (Ph.D. 1974), geneticist, Higgins Professor of Neuropsychology at Columbia University
Terry Jean Wilson (BS), Antarctic researcher
Ta You Wu (Ph.D. 1933), "the father of Chinese physics"
Zhu Guangya (Chinese: 朱光亚 (Ph.D. 1950), nuclear physicist; academician of Chinese Academy of Sciences; vice chairman of 8th and 9th Chinese People's Political Consultative Conference; led the development of China's atomic and hydrogen bomb programs
George Zweig (BS 1959), a graduate student when he published "the definitive compilation of elementary particles and their properties" in 1963, the work that led up to his theory about the existence of quarks in 1964; considered to have developed the theory of quarks independently of Murray Gell-Mann
Kathleen Weston (BS Biology 1929), world renowned toxicologist, worked on the Salk polio vaccine, taught from the Sunday school level to the medical school level for over 50 years
Efrat Lifshitz (M.Sc. 1981, Ph.D. 1984), professor of chemistry at the Technion – Israel Institute of Technology
Yıldız Bayazıtoğlu (M.Sc. 1969, Ph.D. 1974), First woman to earn doctorate of engineering at University of Michigan, Fellow of the American Society of Mechanical Engineers, Fellow of the American Association for the Advancement of Science, Harry S. Cameron Chair in Mechanical Engineering at Rice University,

National Medal of Science Laureates/National Medal of Technology and Innovation

Fay Ajzenberg-Selove, German-American nuclear physicist winner of the National Medal of Science
Detlev Wulf Bronk, credited with establishing biophysics as a recognized discipline winner of the National Medal of Science
John W. Cahn, scientist, winner of the 1998 National Medal of Science
Stanley Cohen (Ph.D.), biochemist; 1986 Nobel Prize Laureate in Physiology and Medicine winner of the National Medal of Science
Carl R. de Boor, German-American mathematician winner of the National Medal of Science
George Dantzig (M.A.), mathematician called by some the "father of linear programming" winner of the National Medal of Science
Harry George Drickamer, born Harold George Weidenthal, pioneer experimentalist in high-pressure studies of condensed matter winner of the National Medal of Science 
Roger L. Easton (MDNG) was an American physicist who was the principal inventor and designer of the Global Positioning System, along with Ivan A. Getting and Bradford Parkinson. Awarded the National Medal of Technology and Innovation in 2006.
Donald N. Frey (Ph.D.), Ford Motor Company product manager; National Medal of Technology winner
Willis M. Hawkins, aeronautical engineer for Lockheed for over fifty years winner of the National Medal of Science
George W. Housner, authority on earthquake engineering; National Medal of Science laureate
Clarence L. Johnson, system engineer, aeronautical innovator winner of the National Medal of Science
Isabella L. Karle, x-ray crystallographer winner of the National Medal of Science
Dr. Donald L. Katz (Ph.D.), chemist, chemical engineer winner of the National Medal of Science
Marshall Warren Nirenberg (Ph.D.), biochemist and geneticist winner of the National Medal of Science
Michael Posner, psychologist winner of the National Medal of Science
Claude E. Shannon, mathematician, electronic engineer, cryptographer; "the father of information theory" winner of the National Medal of Science
Isadore Singer, Institute Professor in the Department of Mathematics at MIT winner of the National Medal of Science
Stephen Smale, mathematician winner of the National Medal of Science
Karen K. Uhlenbeck, professor of mathematics winner of the National Medal of Science
Donald Dexter Van Slyke (Ph.D.), Dutch American biochemist winner of the National Medal of Science
Charles M. Vest (Ph.D.) was an American educator and engineer. He served as president of the Massachusetts Institute of Technology from October 1990 until December 2004. Winner, in 2006, of the National Medal of Technology and Innovation

Sloan Research Fellows
James Andreoni (born 1959 in Beloit, Wisconsin) is a professor in the Economics Department of the University of California, San Diego, where he directs the EconLab.
John Avise (born 1948) is an American evolutionary geneticist, conservationist, ecologist and natural historian. 
Robert Berner (November 25, 1935 – January 10, 2015) was an American scientist known for his contributions to the modeling of the carbon cycle.
Allan M. Collins is an American cognitive scientist, Professor Emeritus of Learning Sciences at Northwestern University's School of Education and Social Policy. 
Ralph Louis Cohen (born 1952) is an American mathematician, specializing in algebraic topology and differential topology.
Michael D. Fried is an American mathematician working in the geometry and arithmetic of families of nonsingular projective curve covers.
William L. Jungers (born November 17, 1948) is an American anthropologist, distinguished teaching professor and the chair of the Department of Anatomical Sciences at State University of New York at Stony Brook on Long Island, New York.
Jeffrey MacKie-Mason is an American economist specializing in information, incentive-centered design and public policy.
Gaven Martin FRSNZ FASL FAMS (born 8 October 1958)[1] is a New Zealand mathematician.
George J. Minty Jr. (September 16, 1929, Detroit – August 6, 1986,[1] Bloomington, Indiana) was an American mathematician, specializing in mathematical analysis and discrete mathematics. He is known for the Klee-Minty cube and the Browder-Minty theorem.
Alison R. H. Narayan (born 1984)[1] is an American chemist and the William R. Roush assistant professor in the Department of Chemistry at the University of Michigan College of Literature, Science, and the Arts.
Homer Neal (June 13, 1942 – May 23, 2018[1]) was an American particle physicist and a distinguished professor at the University of Michigan.
Hugh David Politzer (/ˈpɑːlɪtsər/; born August 31, 1949) is an American theoretical physicist and the Richard Chace Tolman Professor of Theoretical Physics at the California Institute of Technology.
Jessica Purcell is an American mathematician specializing in low-dimensional topology whose research topics have included hyperbolic Dehn surgery and the Jones polynomial. 
Donald Sarason (January 26, 1933 – April 8, 2017) was an American mathematician who made fundamental advances in the areas of Hardy space theory and VMO. 
Stephen Smale (born July 15, 1930) is an American mathematician, known for his research in topology, dynamical systems and mathematical economics.
Richard Smalley (June 6, 1943 – October 28, 2005) was the Gene and Norman Hackerman Professor of Chemistry and a Professor of Physics and Astronomy at Rice University. 
Karen E. Smith (born 1965 in Red Bank, New Jersey)[1] is an American mathematician, specializing in commutative algebra and algebraic geometry.
James Stasheff (born January 15, 1936, New York City)[1] is an American mathematician
Chelsea Walton is a mathematician whose research interests include noncommutative algebra, noncommutative algebraic geometry, symmetry in quantum mechanics, Hopf algebras, and quantum groups.
Zhouping Xin (Chinese: 辛周平; born 13 July 1959) is a Chinese mathematician and the William M.W. Mong Professor of Mathematics at the Chinese University of Hong Kong.[1] He specializes in partial differential equations.

Sports
See List of University of Michigan sporting alumni

References

NOTE: The University of Michigan Alumni Directory is no longer printed, as of 2004.  To find more recent information on an alumnus, you must log into the Alumni Association website to search their online directory.

External links
University of Michigan Alumni
Famous U-M Alumni
Alumni association of the University of Michigan
UM Alumni Information

University of Michigan alumni